The following is a list of major crimes in Singapore that happened in 2000 and beyond. They are arranged in chronological order.

2000s

2000 
 7 February 2000: 27-year-old Linda Chua, a finance executive, was brutally assaulted and raped at Bukit Batok Nature Park while jogging there. She died eight days later on 14 February 2000. , the case remains unsolved.
 17 May 2000: 36-year-old Leong Fook Weng, who was having a fight with four people, was found dead in a vacant plot of land with only his underwear on and several stab wounds on his body. 22-year-old William Ho Kah Wei (alias Soh Tan Huat), who knew that the gang of four has killed Leong but never reported the crime to the police, was arrested and sent to jail for six months. The four assailants all fled from Singapore after killing Leong, but one of them, 36-year-old Robson Tay Teik Chai, was discovered to be in France serving a two-year sentence for drug offences. After Tay's release, he was sent back to Singapore in 2003, where he was sentenced to nine years' imprisonment and 12 strokes of the cane for culpable homicide. The second assailant, 34-year-old See Chee Keong, was discovered in a Cambodian prison, where he was serving 18 years' imprisonment for drug trafficking. See, who served 13 years out of his jail term, later received a royal pardon and in November 2013, See was released and deported from Cambodia and returned to Singapore for trial. Having embraced religion and reformed while in prison, See expressed remorse for his crime and willingly surrendered to face the consequences of his crime, and his family and grandson tried to plead to the courts for leniency on his behalf. See was sentenced to ten years' imprisonment on 20 April 2016 for culpable homicide, and he was spared from caning due to him having reached the age of 50. The remaining two assailants - Ong Chin Huat (aged 41 in 2000) and Lim Hin Teck (or Lim Teck Hin; aged 36 in 2000) - remain at large as of today.
 8 and 26 August 2000: On the morning of 8 August, 34-year-old Wan Kamil bin Md Shafian, 35-year-old Ibrahim bin Mohd and 30-year-old Rosli bin Ahmat intended to commit armed robbery. They targeted a taxi driven by 42-year-old Koh Ngiap Yong and told him to drive to Chestnut Drive before handcuffing him. Kamil ordered Rosli to stab Koh with a bayonet before they unlocked the handcuffs. In the process, they dropped a handcuff key. They drove to Woodlands, where they planned to commit robbery but eventually backed out due to the presence of CCTVs. Koh's body was discovered the following morning, but the murder was unsolved due to a lack of leads until another murder occurred on the evening of 26 August. Kamil and Ibrahim had robbed and fatally shot 39-year-old Jagabar Sathik (also spelt Jahabar Sathick), a money changer, at an overhead bridge in Jalan Kukoh. The police traced the stolen phone from the deceased Sathik to Kamil and Ibrahim. All three of them were arrested on 15 October 2000 by the police tactical unit STAR. Koh's murder was traced to them when the handcuffs and keys recovered at Kamil's flat did not tally with each other. On 5 September 2001, all three of them were found guilty of murder and sentenced to death by High Court judge M. P. H. Rubin. On 7 March 2002, the Court of Appeal turned down their appeals and all three of them were eventually hanged on 25 October 2002.

2001 
 14 May 2001: 34-year-old Anthony Ler Wee Teang made headlines in Singapore in 2001 for hiring a youth to assassinate his wife, 30-year-old Annie Leong Wai Mun, who was in the midst of divorcing him, so that he could become the sole owner of their flat and gain custody of their four-year-old daughter. Ler approached four youths and offered them a reward of S$100,000 to kill Leong. A 15-year-old boy whom Ler had known for five years accepted the offer. Ler threatened and manipulated the youth to carry out the deed and after several failed attempts, the youth fatally stabbed Leong with a knife given to him by Ler. The boy, in view of his age, was not named to protect his identity. Ler, who was seen smiling throughout the court proceedings and in the media, was eventually convicted of masterminding the murder and sentenced to death by High Court judge Tay Yong Kwang on 5 December 2001. Ler appealed to the Court of Appeal but failed; President S. R. Nathan also rejected his plea for clemency. As such, Ler was eventually hanged in Changi Prison on 13 December 2002. The youth, due to his age, was spared the gallows and indefinitely detained under the President's Pleasure for 17 years for committing murder. The youth had been released since 2 November 2018 but a gag order remains in force to protect his identity.
 30–31 May 2001: A 17-year-old football player, Sulaiman bin Hashim, was brutally assaulted and murdered by eight members of the street gang Salakau, led by their 21-year-old leader Norhisham bin Mohamad Dahlan, outside a pub at South Bridge Road. Six gang members were found guilty of culpable homicide not amounting to murder, rioting, voluntarily causing grievous hurt, or any combination of these charges. One of them, Muhamad Hasik bin Sahar, was sentenced to life imprisonment and 16 strokes of the cane, while the rest, including the mastermind Norhisham, received jail terms of between ten years and three years, as well as between 16 and six strokes of the cane. , two other gang members – Sharulhawzi bin Ramly and Muhammad Syamsul Ariffin bin Brahim – are still at large.
 10 August 2001: 33-year-old businessman Tay Teng Joo was kidnapped one day before his wedding by 45-year-old Chng Teo Heng and two accomplices, 52-year-old Agnes Ng Lei Eng and 42-year-old Ng Soon Teck. They blindfolded him and drove him around in a car while demanding a ransom of S$4 million from his family. The sum was eventually reduced to S$1.22 million and Tay was released. The police managed to arrest all the three kidnappers and recover the ransom. All three of them were found guilty of kidnapping and sentenced to life imprisonment. Chng was also sentenced to six strokes of the cane for using a knife during the kidnapping. Ng had asked the judge to give her the death penalty but the judge refused and sentenced her to life imprisonment.
 2 October 2001: 16-year-old Gunasegaran Ramasamy robbed and stabbed 28-year-old Soh San in a lift at a HDB block in Bukit Batok. Soh died of her wounds while Gunasegaran fled with S$30. The case was unsolved despite appeals for eyewitnesses from an episode of the television series Crimewatch. Gunasegaran was arrested for committing other offences in the following years and the police did not know about his role in Soh's death. On 17 November 2013, out of guilt, a 28-year-old Gunasegaran surrendered himself and confessed to killing Soh. Although he was initially charged with murder, the charge was reduced to robbery with hurt and he was sentenced to 10 years' imprisonment and 12 strokes of the cane by district judge Tan Jen Tse.
 8 November 2001: 48-year-old Peh Thian Hui was arrested at his flat following a police report lodged by a 15-year-old girl. The girl reported to the police and revealed that throughout a period of 5 years from 1996 to 2001, she has been raped by Peh over 50 times, with the consent of her mother, who was Peh's lover for the past 10 years even though he was married with three children. The girl was reported to have suffered from a sexually-transmitted disease as a result of the rapes. The girl's 35-year-old mother and Peh's lover, who cannot be named to protect the identity of the girl, was also arrested and promptly charged with abetting her lover to rape her daughter, and Peh was also charged with rape. In May 2002, both Peh and the mother pleaded guilty to the respective charges against them at the trial. They were each sentenced to a total of 36 years in prison. In addition, Peh also received the maximum of 24 strokes of the cane for raping the girl.
 2 December 2001: 19-year-old Indonesian domestic helper Muawanatul Chasanah was physically abused and starved over a nine-month period by her employer, 47-year-old Ng Hua Chye. On 1 December 2001, Ng kicked her in the stomach so hard that it ruptured; she eventually died due to peritonitis. The case came to light after Ng surrendered himself to the police on 2 December 2001. Initially charged with murder, Ng had ultimately his charges reduced to culpable homicide and voluntarily causing hurt. On 19 July 2002, High Court judge Choo Han Teck sentenced Ng to 18 years and six months' imprisonment and 12 strokes of the cane. Ng's wife, 30-year-old Rainbow Tan Chai Hong, was also arrested and charged with voluntarily causing hurt to Muawanatul and failing to report her husband's actions to the police. On 19 February 2003, magistrate Alvin Koh sentenced Tan to nine months' imprisonment.
 9–24 December 2001: A plot by terrorist group Jemaah Islamiyah (JI) to bomb several embassies in Singapore and Yishun MRT station was uncovered by the Internal Security Department, leading to the arrests of 15 Singapore-based JI members that month. In the subsequent years, about 40 more JI-linked individuals were arrested.
 31 December 2001: 56-year-old Quek Loo Ming added one teaspoon of methomyl into a bottle of water and hoped that 49-year-old Doreen Lum, the chairperson of a residents' committee in Clementi, would drink it. He had done so because he was unhappy that she had treated him like an "errand boy" when he was volunteering at the committee, and had hoped that she would suffer from diarrhoea. Lum did not drink the water; three others drank it instead and ended up being hospitalised. One of the three victims, 62-year-old Fong Oi Lin, died of poisoning on 3 January 2002; the other two – 38-year-old Richard Ho Shi Shong and 66-year-old Wong Ah Kim – survived. Police investigations led to the arrest of Quek, who was initially charged with murder. On 5 August 2002, High Court judge Choo Han Teck sentenced Quek to nine years' imprisonment for culpable homicide and a concurrent jail term of three years for voluntarily causing grievous hurt. On 8 November 2002, after the prosecution appealed for a heavier sentence, the Court of Appeal increased Quek's two jail terms on both charges to ten years and five years respectively, with both sentences to run consecutively, making it a total of 15 years' imprisonment.

2002 
 2 January 2002: Known as the "Orchard Towers double murders", 44-year-old British financial adviser Michael McCrea killed his chauffeur and friend, 46-year-old Kho Nai Guan, and Kho's girlfriend, 29-year-old Chinese national Lan Ya Ming, in his apartment in Balmoral Park. The killings had been triggered by a quarrel after Kho insulted McCrea's girlfriend, 22-year-old Audrey Ong Pei Ling. McCrea and Kho then got into a fight, which ended with McCrea strangling Kho to death. McCrea also knocked Lan unconscious and later secured plastic bags over her head, causing her to suffocate to death. McCrea and Ong later contacted their respective friends, Gemma Louise Ramsbottom and Justin Cheo Yi Tang, for help in disposing of the two dead bodies. On 4 January, Kho's body was stuffed into a wicker basket and left in the rear seat of a Daewoo Chairman while Lan's body was stuffed into the car boot; the car was then abandoned at Orchard Towers. McCrea and Ong then fled Singapore on 5 January, but were arrested in Melbourne in June 2002 and extradited to Singapore in 2003 and 2005 respectively. In order to secure McCrea's extradition, Singapore had to assure Australia that he would not be sentenced to death if he was found guilty of murder as Australian law prohibits the extradition of anyone to another jurisdiction if the individual could be sentenced to death. Ong was sentenced on 7 February 2003 to 12 years' imprisonment for her role in disposing the victims' bodies. Ramsbottom and Cheo testified against McCrea during his trial, claiming that they had been threatened with bodily harm if they did not cooperate. McCrea eventually pleaded guilty to culpable homicide and concealing evidence of the killings. On 29 June 2006, High Court judge Choo Han Teck sentenced McCrea to 24 years' imprisonment. McCrea appealed against his sentence but the three-judge Court of Appeal dismissed his appeal as they deemed that he lacked remorse. If Michael McCrea served his sentence with good behaviour, he will be released from prison early on 29 June 2022 after serving at least 16 years in prison.
 February 2002 – July 2012: For over a period of ten years, Perak-born Malaysian and accountant Ewe Pang Kooi siphoned $41 million from over 20 companies which he was formerly employed under during the past decade mainly to feed his gambling addiction, as well as settle debts or reinstate amounts he had siphoned off. To cover his tracks, he moved funds between the various entities. Ewe's wrongdoings were uncovered in July 2012 when one of the companies, the HP Group chased him about the assets from the liquidation of the companies. Ewe was arrested and faced 50 charges of criminal breach of trust as an agent, which potentially warrants the maximum term of life imprisonment. Only $17 million were recovered by the police while the remaining $24 million remained unaccounted for. Ewe was found guilty of his crimes. In view of Ewe's advanced age of 65, his remorse and full cooperation with the police, High Court judge Chan Seng Onn sentenced Ewe Pang Kooi to 25 years and 10 months' imprisonment on 16 July 2019.
 28 May 2002: 23-year-old Indonesian domestic worker Sundarti Supriyanto fatally stabbed and murdered her 34-year-old employer, Angie Ng, in her office in Bukit Merah. After that, she set fire to the office and came out carrying Ng's 18-month-old son, Leon Poh. Ng's three-year-old daughter, Crystal Poh, died in the fire. Sundarti was arrested after knife wounds were discovered on Ng's body. Although she lied at first that the fire had been caused by masked men, she eventually admitted to starting the fire but denied killing Ng. During her trial, the prosecution sought to portray her as a cold-blooded killer and discredit her claims of being abused by Ng. The defence, on the other hand, argued that she had been abused by Ng and that had caused her to lose control of herself and kill her employer. After a 27-day trial, High Court judge M. P. H. Rubin accepted Sundarti's allegations of Ng starving and physically abusing her based on the testimonies of Ng's colleagues who witnessed these abuses and thus found Sundarti guilty of a lesser charge of culpable homicide not amounting to murder, and sentenced her on 25 September 2004 to life imprisonment.
 5 August 2002: Soosainathan Dass Saminathan, an Indian national, had killed six-month-old Anjeli Elisaputri, the daughter of his friend Jalil Hameed and Jalil's Indonesian girlfriend. He was said to have abducted the baby while her mother was sleeping next to the infant before he sexually assaulted and killed her. He also wrapped the baby's corpse in a blanket before disposing it down a rubbish chute. Later, the police arrested Soosainathan as a suspect and charged him with the infant's murder. On 17 July 2003, Soosainathan was found guilty of Anjeli's murder and sentenced to death. He was hanged on 22 May 2004 after losing his appeal against the death sentence.
 December 2002: Australian citizen Van Tuong Nguyen was convicted of carrying about 400 grams of heroin at Changi Airport while travelling from Cambodia to Australia and sentenced to death on 20 March 2004 by High Court judge Kan Ting Chiu. After a failed appeal to the Court of Appeal and despite pleas for clemency from the Australian government, Nguyen was hanged on 2 December 2005.

2003 
 7 August 2003: Selvaraju s/o Satippan, a jobless man, was arrested for kidnapping 22-year-old Nina Elizabeth Varghese, a MediaCorp journalist, and charged with kidnapping, causing hurt and attempted murder. In 2004, a 45-year-old Selvaraju was sentenced to life imprisonment and 24 strokes of the cane by High Court judge Tay Yong Kwang. He appealed against his sentence but lost the appeal.
 25 December 2003: A seven-year-old girl was briefly kidnapped by 35-year-old Tan Ping Koon and 42-year-old Chua Ser Lien. She was in a house at Yio Chu Kang when Chua sneaked in and took her into a car driven by Tan. A catering assistant caught them in the act and took down the car's licence plate number. The information was relayed to the catering assistant's husband. When he spotted the getaway car, he decided to follow them in his own vehicle. The two kidnappers realised they were being followed so they released the girl at Tampines. However, the two kidnappers called the girl's father the following day and demanded S$1 million from him or they would hurt her family. The sum of S$70,000 was eventually agreed and paid to them before Tan and Chua were subsequently arrested on 27 December in the same year. They were both found guilty of kidnapping and sentenced by High Court judge Tay Yong Kwang to life imprisonment and three strokes of the cane each. 17 years later, a 58-year-old Chua committed suicide in Changi Prison on 8 July 2020 while serving his life sentence.

2004 
 2 April 2004: 44-year-old Chia Teck Leng was sentenced to 42 years in jail by High Court judge Tay Yong Kwang after swindling four foreign banks out of S$117 million from 1999 to 2003 using his position as the financial manager of Asia Pacific Breweries. Chia's sentence of 42 years' imprisonment was the longest sentence ever meted out for a commercial crime in Singapore, surpassing that of Teo Cheng Kiat in 2000, who was sentenced to 24 years' imprisonment for embezzling approximately S$35 million from Singapore Airlines for 13 years before his arrest in January 2000.
 2 April 2004: 44-year-old Lim Poh Lye and two accomplices attempted to rob 56-year-old scrap car dealer Bock Thuan Thong and killed him when the situation escalated unexpectedly after he tried to escape. Bock's body was then abandoned in a car at Boon Keng. An autopsy revealed that Bock had sustained seven stab wounds on his thighs, of which two were fatal. Two days later, Lim surrendered himself to the police. About ten weeks later, one of Lim's two accomplices, 36-year-old Tony Koh Zhan Quan, who had fled to Malaysia, surrendered himself to the Royal Malaysia Police and was extradited to Singapore. Both Lim and Koh were charged with murder, while their third accomplice and the mastermind of the robbery, 43-year-old Ng Kim Soon, has gone on the run since then. On 24 January 2005, High Court judge Choo Han Teck reduced the murder charges to robbery with hurt and convicted both men of the reduced charges. Lim, the one who stabbed Bock, was sentenced to 20 years' jail and 24 strokes of the cane, while Koh was sentenced to 15 years' imprisonment and 20 strokes of the cane. However, after the prosecution appeal, both men were found guilty of murder on 15 July 2005 and sentenced to death by the Court of Appeal. The two men were hanged on 28 April 2006. , Ng is still at large.
 17 May 2004: 43-year-old G. Krishnasamy Naidu hacked his wife, 39-year-old Chitrabathy d/o Narayanasamy, to death with a chopper in front of several witnesses at his wife's workplace in Tuas. At the time, Krishnasamy was out on bail after stabbing his wife twice with a knife on 8 April 2004. Nine hours after killing his wife, Krishnasamy surrendered himself to the police and was charged with murder. At the trial, it was revealed that Chitra had been involved in several extramarital affairs over her 20-year marriage with Krishnasamy. It was only in 2004 that Krishnasamy suspected Chitra of having an affair again and caused grievous hurt to her in front of their two teenage children. On 17 May 2004, he came to see Chitra at her workplace under the pretext of bringing her divorce papers to sign, and killed her once she turned her back on him. Krishnasamy's defence counsel, led by lawyer Peter Keith Fernando, consulted two psychiatrists – George Joseph Fernandez and Stephen Phang Boon Chai – and they testified in court that Krishnasamy was suffering from a mental condition known as morbid jealousy, which made him qualify for diminished responsibility when he committed the crime. The prosecution's psychiatrist, however, said that Krishnasamy was not suffering from any abnormality of mind during the killing. On 26 April 2006, High Court judge Woo Bih Li accepted that Krishnasamy was indeed suffering from morbid jealousy before, during and after the crime. However, the judge felt that Krishnasamy failed to substantiate his defence of diminished responsibility as he was still capable of making precise decisions and clear judgments at the time of the offence despite his mental illness. Thus, the judge found Krishnasamy guilty of murder and sentenced him to death. Krishnasamy later won his appeal against his conviction and sentence as the Court of Appeal accepted that he was indeed suffering from an abnormality of mind when he killed Chitra. The court also cited that even some people suffering from diminished responsibility are still fully capable of making clear judgments. As such, Krishnasamy was found guilty of a lesser charge of culpable homicide not amounting to murder, and sentenced to life imprisonment.
 1 June 2004: 37-year-old Chong Keng Chye was sentenced to 20 years' preventive detention and nine strokes of the cane for severely abusing a seven-year-old boy to death in 1999, as well as for several cheating offences. He also manipulated the boy's mother – his 40-year-old girlfriend – to assist him in abusing the boy for several months until the boy's death on 3 June 1999. He even told the boy's mother to make false statements to the police about her son's death. Over the next four years, Chong and the boy's mother cheated six people of S$200,000. When they were arrested in August 2003 for cheating, the police discovered that they were responsible for the boy's death as well. Both Chong and the boy's mother were initially charged with murder and abetment of murder respectively. The latter was eventually convicted of cheating and abetting Chong to abuse her son and two daughters. On 11 May 2004, she was sentenced to four years and seven months' imprisonment in view of her low IQ of 80, which made her vulnerable to being manipulated by Chong to abuse her children. During sentencing, district judge Kow Keng Siong described Chong, who had been in and out of jail since he was a teenager, as an individual with a "sadistic and violent streak" and "a clear disregard for the authority and law", which warranted a lengthy jail term for the protection of society. The judge also expressed his concern over Chong's strong propensity to re-offend and his lack of remorse over his crimes.
 7 October 2004: Four-year-old Sindee Neo was abducted from her home and thrown off from her flat at Telok Blangah, causing her to sustain fatal head injuries that led to her death five days later. Chee Cheong Hin Constance, a former Singapore Airlines stewardess and the lover of Neo's father, was initially charged with abduction and murder. However, her murder charge was later reduced to culpable homicide not amounting to murder after she was found suffering from schizophrenia. In January 2006, a 37-year-old Chee was found guilty of both charges of abducting Neo and causing her death. On 7 April 2006, High Court judge V. K. Rajah sentenced her to a total of 13 years' imprisonment – 10 years for killing Neo and three years for the abduction.
 10 October 2004: Eight-year-old Huang Na was found dead and stuffed inside a box at Telok Blangah Hill Park. Took Leng How, a Malaysian who was an acquaintance of Huang's mother, was arrested and charged with the murder of Huang Na. On 27 August 2005, High Court judge Lai Kew Chai found Took guilty and sentenced him to death. A 24-year-old Took was hanged on 3 November 2006 after failing to overturn his conviction at the Court of Appeal and after President S. R. Nathan rejected his plea for clemency.
 November 2004: Nigerian citizen Iwuchukwu Amara Tochi was arrested at Changi Airport for carrying 100 capsules containing heroin. On 22 December 2005, High Court judge Kan Ting Chiu found Tochi guilty of drug trafficking and sentenced him to death. Tochi was eventually hanged on 26 January 2007 after failing to overturn his conviction at the Court of Appeal and after President S. R. Nathan rejected his plea for clemency.

2005 
 6 May 2005: 29-year-old Muhammad bin Kadar stabbed 69-year-old Tham Weng Kuen more than 110 times during a robbery in her flat in Boon Lay and caused her to die. When he was arrested for the murder, Muhammad implicated his 37-year-old brother, Ismil bin Kadar, as an accomplice and claimed that Ismil was the one who killed Tham when he ransacked the flat. Muhammad later retracted his statement and claimed that his brother was innocent and that he was the only one involved in the robbery. Ismil, who was arrested and promptly charged with murder together with Muhammad, insisted his innocence throughout the trial and denied making any confessions about his alleged involvement in the crime. Nevertheless, after a trial lasting 94 days from 2006 to 2008, the brothers were found guilty of murder and sentenced to death by the High Court. Both of them appealed against their sentences and the Court of Appeal decided that Ismil was not involved in the robbery and murder, so on 6 July 2011 the court acquitted Ismil of murder and dismissed Muhammad's appeal. When changes to the law took effect in 2013, Muhammad applied for re-sentencing but the Court of Appeal rejected on the grounds that he had clearly intended to cause death to the victim when he inflicted more than 110 stab wounds on her. On 17 April 2015, after losing his appeal for presidential clemency, a 39-year-old Muhammad was hanged in Changi Prison.
 15–16 June 2005: In a case known as the Kallang River body parts murder, 50-year-old Leong Siew Chor murdered his lover, 22-year-old Chinese national Liu Hong Mei, and dismembered her body into seven parts. He dumped her body parts at multiple places across Singapore, including the Kallang River. He also stole her credit card and withdrew S$2,000 from her bank account after having sex with her. He was arrested on 17 June 2005. On 19 May 2006, High Court judge Tay Yong Kwang found Leong guilty of murder and sentenced him to death. Leong was hanged on 30 November 2007 after President S. R. Nathan rejected his plea for clemency.
 7 September 2005: 29-year-old Filipino domestic helper Guen Garlejo Aguilar killed her friend, 26-year-old Jane Parangan La Puebla, who was also working as a domestic helper in Singapore. On 7 September 2005, the two women had gotten into a quarrel over a S$2,000 debt which La Puebla owed Aguilar. The quarrel soon became a fight, which ended with Aguilar smothering and strangling La Puebla to death in the condominium at Serangoon where Aguilar worked. Aguilar hid La Puebla's body inside a luggage bag in her room – unknown to her employers. On 9 September 2005, after her employers had gone to work, Aguilar purchased various items and used them to dismember La Puebla's body and clean up the scene. She then placed the body parts in separate bags before disposing of them at Orchard Road and near MacRitchie Reservoir. After the body parts were discovered, the police solved the case within the next 12 hours and arrested Aguilar. Before Aguilar's trial started in May 2006, the charges against her were reduced to manslaughter after her defence lawyers argued that she suffered from depression and that La Puebla's death had resulted from a grave and sudden provocation. Aguilar pleaded guilty and was sentenced by High Court judge V. K. Rajah to ten years' imprisonment.
 24 December 2005: On the night before Christmas, a group of four Malaysians National - 20-year-old Hamir Bin Hasim, 21-year-old Kamal Bin Kupli, 25-year-old Abdul Malik Bin Usman and 17-year-old Benedict Inyang Anak Igai - decided to commit robbery. Upon spotting 41-year-old Myanmar national Thein Naing walking nearby Upper Boon Keng Road, Benedict acted as lookout at the nearby area while the remaining three went to attack Thein and assaulted him by stabbing him and kicking him in the head. Thein died due to the knife wounds and severe head injuries, and the gang took away his wallet and cash. A passer-by later discovered Thein's corpse and contacted the police, who later investigated and arrested all the four Malaysians, who had also committed a few more robberies prior to Thein's murder and their arrests. Benedict was later sentenced to five years' imprisonment and 12 strokes of the cane for robbery with hurt, while the remaining three men - Hamir, Kamal and Abdul Malik - were convicted of murder and sentenced to death in June 2007. All three condemned lost their appeals in February 2008, and they were eventually hanged in September 2008.

2006 
 15 February 2006: 39-year-old gangster Tan Chor Jin, nicknamed "One-eyed Dragon" because he was blind in his right eye, forcefully entered the apartment of 41-year-old nightclub owner Lim Hock Soon. He robbed Lim and his family of their valuables before shooting Lim to death. After that, he fled Singapore with help from his accomplice, Ho Yueh Keong. He was nabbed by the Royal Malaysia Police ten days later at a hotel in Kuala Lumpur before he was extradited to Singapore on 1 March 2006. Initially charged with murder, his charge was amended to one of an unlawful discharge of a firearm. During the trial, Tan chose to be unrepresented by legal counsel. In his defence, he claimed that Lim was about to hit him with a chair and thus he shot Lim in self-defence. However, his defence fell flat when the prosecution noted that Lim was tied up and could not have lifted the chair. On 22 May 2007, High Court judge Tay Yong Kwang found Tan guilty of murder and sentenced him to death. Tan was eventually hanged on 9 January 2009 after the Court of Appeal dismissed his appeal on 30 January 2008. Lim Choon Chwee, the driver who drove Tan to Lim's apartment, was given a discharge not amounting to an acquittal for abetting the murder and sentenced to six months imprisonment for failing to report the robbery. Ho, who was on the run for nine years before he was arrested and extradited back to Singapore, was charged on 15 July 2015 for harbouring a fugitive and pleaded guilty on 8 August 2016. Two days later, he was sentenced to a 20-month jail term.
 1 March 2006: Nurasyura binte Mohamed Fauzi, a two-year-old girl better known as Nonoi, went missing in early 2006. There was a highly publicised search for Nonoi, in which the police and various strangers joined her family in searching for her. Three days later, 29-year-old Mohammed Ali bin Johari, Nonoi's stepfather, tearfully confessed to his wife and mother-in-law that Nonoi was dead and he had accidentally drowned her in water while trying to get her to stop crying. Mohammed Ali surrendered himself to the police and led them to the place where he disposed Nonoi's body. The autopsy results found sexual injuries on Nonoi's body, implying that Mohammed Ali had raped her before the alleged murder. Throughout the trial, Mohammed Ali repeatedly denied raping Nonoi and maintained that her death was accidental. On 31 August 2007, High Court judge Kan Ting Chiu found a 31-year-old Mohammed Ali guilty of murder and sentenced him to death. Mohammed Ali later lost his appeal and was hanged on 19 December 2008.
 30 May 2006: In a robbery masterminded by their two other accomplices, a group of three men – 22-year-old Daniel Vijay s/o Katherasan, 23-year-old Christopher Samson s/o Anpalagan, and 47-year-old Nakamuthu Balakrishnan – robbed 46-year-old lorry driver Wan Cheon Kem of 2,700 mobile phones, which were worth S$1.3 million. During the robbery at Changi Coast Road, Balakrishnan used a baseball bat to bash Wan at least 15 times. Wan died in hospital six days later. The three men, as well as the two masterminds – 36-year-old Ragu a/l Ramajayam and 38-year-old Arsan s/o Krishnasamy Govindarajoo – were all arrested. Among the stolen 2,700 mobile phones, only 2,158 were recovered. Ragu and Arsan were charged with abetting armed robbery with hurt while the three men – Daniel, Christopher and Balakrishnan – were charged with murder. Ragu, who knew of Wan's assignment of delivering the mobile phones and informed the other four men to plan the robbery, pleaded guilty to his role in the robbery and sentenced to six years' imprisonment and 12 strokes of the cane on 24 April 2007. Later, he successfully appealed for his sentence to be reduced to four years and six months in jail and six strokes of the cane. Arsan was convicted of abetment of armed robbery with hurt and a few other charges and sentenced to 16 years and six months' imprisonment and 24 strokes of the cane. The three men who stood trial for murder – Daniel, Christopher and Balakrishnan – were all found guilty of murder and sentenced to death by High Court judge Tay Yong Kwang on 28 July 2008. Daniel and Christopher appealed against their sentences and the Court of Appeal convicted them of lesser charges of armed robbery with hurt on 3 September 2010. On 4 October 2010, Daniel and Christopher were each sentenced to 15 years' imprisonment and 15 strokes of the cane. Balakrishnan was eventually hanged on 22 July 2011 after he declined to proceed with his appeal against the death sentence.
 2 June 2006: 42-year-old lawyer David Rasif fled Singapore with S$11.3 million of his clients' money and has been on the run since then. In the days before his disappearance, he had made S$11 million worth of transfers around several locations and bought over S$2 million worth of jewellery. As at 2013, the sum of S$11.3 million was the largest amount of money misappropriated by a lawyer in Singapore. Over S$10 million of the S$11.3 million came from an American couple, George and Kaori Zage, who had engaged Rasif to complete a property transaction in May 2006. Over the subsequent years, the Commercial Affairs Department managed to recover S$7.4 million in the form of cash and gold bars from bank accounts in Singapore, Hong Kong and Vietnam. Rasif was also investigated for a property cashback scam which started in 2004. His two accomplices – property agent Goh Chong Liang and lawyer David Tan Hock Boon – were arrested and respectively sentenced to five years and five months' imprisonment in August 2007 and five years' imprisonment in November 2008. , Rasif is still on Interpol's wanted list. A 2013 news report revealed that one of Rasif's three daughters Jade won second place in a modelling contest and she became a celebrity since her contest participation.
 August 2006 – November 2007: Entrepreneur James Phang Wah, director of Sunshine Empire, had swindled S$190 million out of numerous people, including retirees and students. Phang had deployed a Ponzi scheme to commit his crimes, enticing his victims with "lifestyle packages" to get them into investing into the scheme. Phang's criminal activities, which lasted 15 months, only ended with his arrest in November 2007. Phang, who did not plead guilty to his crimes and never shown any remorse for his treachery, was sentenced to nine years' imprisonment and fined S$66,000 for criminal breach of trust in July 2010. His wife, Neo Kuon Huay, was fined S$60,000 and his accomplice, Hoo Choon Cheat, was jailed for seven years for their roles in Phang's criminal activities. On 20 December 2017, a 58-year-old Phang was released from prison. The next day, he faced charges of fraud which he committed in Malaysia.

2007 
 12 June 2007: 19-year-old Malaysian citizen Yong Vui Kong was arrested for transporting more than 47 grams of heroin from Malaysia to Singapore. He was found guilty of drug trafficking and sentenced to death by the High Court in November 2008. He initially lost his appeal against the death sentence and failed in his plea for clemency to President S. R. Nathan. However, after changes to the law took effect in 2013, judges have the discretion to sentence drug traffickers who only act as couriers or having fulfilled any other conditions, to life imprisonment with or without caning instead of death. Yong was thus re-sentenced by High Court judge Choo Han Teck to life imprisonment and 15 strokes of the cane in November 2013. On 22 August 2014, Yong's lawyer, M Ravi, appealed against the sentence, arguing that caning was unconstitutional. On 4 March 2015, the three-judge Court of Appeal dismissed the appeal.
 30 June 2007: 19-year-old Felicia Teo Wei Ling, a student at LASALLE College of the Arts, was last seen near a friend's flat in Marine Parade before she was reported missing on 3 July 2007. The case garnered significant media attention and searches were conducted locally and internationally to trace her whereabouts. In mid-2020, the case was transferred to the police's Criminal Investigation Department, which found that Teo had allegedly been killed by two of her schoolmates living near where she was last seen. One of them, 35-year-old Ahmad Danial bin Mohamed Rafa'ee, was arrested and charged with murder in December 2020. The other schoolmate, 32-year-old Ragil Putra Setia Sukmarahjana, was not in Singapore when Ahmad was arrested and has been at large since then. Ahmad's arrest also sparked renewed interest in Teo's case and other missing persons' cases. Subsequently, on 27 June 2022, Ahmad was granted a discharge not amounting to an acquittal for Teo's alleged murder, but he served 26 months in prison for reduced charges of disposal of Teo's corpse, misappropriating Teo's belongings and falsifying his 2007 statements to the police. , Ragil remains at large.
 1 July 2007: 16-year-old Muhammad Nasir bin Abdul Aziz was ordered by his lover, 24-year-old Aniza binte Essa, to murder her husband, 29-year-old Manap bin Sarlip. In the early morning of 1 July 2007, Nasir stabbed Manap nine times near their apartment in Whampoa. Nasir and Aniza were arrested shortly later and charged with murder. Although Aniza initially faced the death penalty for abetting murder, the charge was eventually reduced to abetment of culpable homicide not amounting to murder because she had a mental condition at the time of the offence which allowed her to qualify for the defence of diminished responsibility. On 28 April 2008, High Court judge Chan Seng Onn sentenced Aniza to nine years' imprisonment. Nasir pleaded guilty to murder but since he was under 18 years of age when he committed the murder, he was spared the gallows and indefinitely detained under the President's Pleasure.
 2 September 2007: 20-year-old National Serviceman Dave Teo Ming sparked a 20-hour-long nationwide manhunt when he went AWOL from Mandai Hill Camp with a SAR-21 assault rifle and eight 5.56 mm rounds. Investigations revealed that Teo went AWOL because he wanted to kill Crystal Liew, his girlfriend who broke up with him in April that same year, as well as five others whom he hated in his life. After his arrest, Teo faced multiple charges under the Arms Offences Act. Teo's fellow serviceman, Ong Boon Jun, who was with Teo when he had the weapons in his possession, was charged under the Arms Offences Act as well. At Teo's trial, it was revealed that Teo had an unhappy childhood and had experienced several tragedies in his life, including his mother abandoning him to his grandparents, parental abuse, and the death of his younger brother in a car accident in March 2001. These events caused Teo to suffer from depression, according to a report from the Institute of Mental Health. Teo had finally snapped after Liew broke up with him and that had driven him to commit the crime. On 9 July 2008, High Court judge Tay Yong Kwang convicted Teo of the charges he faced, and sentenced him to nine years and two months' imprisonment and 18 strokes of the cane. During sentencing, the judge expressed his sympathy towards Teo for his unfortunate circumstances and advised him to turn over a new leaf while in prison. As for Ong, he was sentenced to six years and six months' jail and six strokes of the cane for consorting with a person in unlawful possession of a firearm.

2008 
 17 February 2008: Kho Jabing and Galing Anak Kujat, two Malaysians working in Singapore, robbed two Chinese nationals in Geylang. One of the victims, 40-year-old Cao Ruyin, was severely bludgeoned on the head by Kho. Cao died from his severe head injuries six days later. Kho and Galing were found guilty of murder and sentenced to death in 2010 by the High Court. Following an appeal in 2011, Galing's conviction was reduced to robbery with hurt and his sentence was reduced to 18 years and six months' imprisonment and 19 strokes of the cane. Kho failed to escape the gallows when his appeal was rejected. After the Singapore government removed the mandatory death penalty in January 2013 for crimes of murder with no intention to kill, Kho's death sentence was commuted to life imprisonment and 24 strokes of the cane following an appeal and a re-trial in the High Court in August 2013. However, the prosecution appealed against the life sentence. In 2015, the five-judge Court of Appeal, by a landmark decision of three to two, sentenced Kho to death, as the majority three judges felt that Kho had demonstrated a blatant disregard for human life and had been vicious in the attack on Cao, which made it more appropriate to sentence Kho to death. Kho was eventually hanged in the afternoon of 20 May 2016 in Changi Prison after his appeal was dismissed earlier that morning. The Court of Appeal's landmark judgement in Kho's case was designated as the sentencing guidelines for murder with no intention to kill under the reformed death penalty laws and has had an effect on several other murder cases in Singapore.
 27 February 2008: Jemaah Islamiyah terrorist Mas Selamat bin Kastari discreetly escaped from the now-defunct Whitley Road Detention Centre, sparking a nationwide manhunt. He managed to flee from Singapore to Malaysia via a handmade floating device on 3 March 2008 and eventually hid himself in Skudai for about a year before he was arrested by Malaysian police on 1 April 2009. He was repatriated to Singapore on 24 September 2010 and detained indefinitely under the Internal Security Act.
 27 April 2008 – 10 June 2008: 47-year-old Bala Kuppusamy attacked and robbed seven women aged between 16 and 34 over a period of about two months. Among the seven victims, four were also raped by Bala. On 30 June 2008, the police arrested Bala, who was then charged with rape, robbery with hurt and aggravated molestation, among other charges. Bala had previously been convicted of rape twice in 1987 and 1993; he was sentenced to 11 years' imprisonment and 24 strokes of the cane in 1987, and 23 years' imprisonment and 24 strokes of the cane in 1993. On 4 March 2009, High Court judge Tay Yong Kwang sentenced a 48-year-old Bala to 42 years' imprisonment and 24 strokes of the cane. Bala's jail term was the longest ever meted out to a sex offender in Singapore.
 16 June 2008: 24-year-old Cheong Chun Yin, a native of Perak, Malaysia, was caught after he passed a bag filled with at least 2.7 kg of heroin to his 54-year-old acoomplice Pang Siew Fum. Both Cheong and Pang were found guilty of drug trafficking and sentenced to death by hanging in 2010, and also lost their appeals. After changes to the law in 2013, Cheong was certified as a mere drug courier and re-sentenced to life imprisonment with 15 strokes of the cane on 20 April 2015. Even though Pang was not a certified drug mule, her death sentence was also commuted to life imprisonment due to her suffering from depression at the time of her crime.
 19 September 2008: In a case known as the Yishun triple murders, 42-year-old Chinese national Wang Zhijian killed his 41-year-old lover Zhang Meng, 17-year-old Feng Jianyu (Zhang's daughter), and 36-year-old Yang Jie (Zhang's flatmate), in Zhang's flat in Yishun. He also attempted to kill Yang's 15-year-old daughter, who became the sole survivor of the incident. The next day, Wang was arrested and charged with three counts of murder. On 30 November 2012, High Court judge Chan Seng Onn sentenced Wang to death for the murder of Yang; Wang had successfully raised a defence of diminished responsibility for the other two murder charges. On 30 November 2014, during the cross-appeal between Wang and the prosecution, the Court of Appeal turned down Wang's appeal against the death sentence and allowed the prosecution's appeal, which found Wang guilty of all three murders. Wang was eventually hanged in Changi Prison.
 20 October 2008: The highly decomposed body of 47-year-old Choo Xue Ying was found in Bukit Batok Nature Park. The police traced Choo's phone to 48-year-old Rosli Bin Yassin and his 35-year-old Indonesian girlfriend Jelly, and arrested them. Rosli eventually admitted to assaulting Choo during an argument in her car when they passed through Bukit Batok Nature Park and had abandoned her there after she fell unconscious, thinking that she was still alive. On 11 May 2012, Rosli, who had multiple previous convictions for theft, cheating, forgery and criminal breach of trust since 1991, was sentenced by High Court judge Woo Bih Li to 12 years' preventive detention for cheating and culpable homicide not amounting to murder. After the prosecution appealed, Rosli's sentence was increased to 20 years' preventive detention by the Court of Appeal in March 2013. Jelly, who was charged with cheating and overstaying, was sentenced to 36 months' imprisonment and fined S$3,000, and she was deported from Singapore upon her release from prison.

2009 
 January - March 2009: In a case known as the Woodlands Door-step molester case, 22-year old Chan Wei Xiang molested the 12 women by either touching their buttocks or grabbing their breasts before they entered their homes. He was charged with outrage of modesty on 25 March 2009, two days after getting arrested, and in August 2009, he was sentenced to 2 years and two months imprisonment and given three strokes of the cane for molesting 12 women, aged 18 and 27 after he pleaded guilty to the charges he faced.
 11 April 2009: 29-year-old Chinese national Wang Wenfeng attempted to rob a taxi driver, 58-year-old Yuen Swee Hong, after flagging down the taxi and telling Yuen to drive him to a secluded spot in Sembawang. During their struggle, Wang stabbed Yuen and fatally wounded him before abandoning him in a nearby forested area. Wang then drove Yuen's taxi to a multi-storey carpark at Canberra Road and cleaned the bloodstains. After that, he called Yuen's wife, Chan Oi Lin, lying to her that he had kidnapped her husband and demanding a ransom. Chan and her elder child and only son, Yuen Zheng Wen, contacted the police, who arrested Wang on 13 April 2009. On 17 April 2009, Wang led the police to the location where he abandoned Yuen's body. In September 2011, High Court judge Lee Seiu Kin found Wang guilty of murder and sentenced him to death. When changes to the law took effect in January 2013, Wang applied for re-sentencing. In November 2013, he was re-sentenced to life imprisonment and 24 strokes of the cane after he substantiated his defence that he had no intent to kill Yuen and only wanted to rob him.
 22 April 2009: 21-year-old Nagaenthran K. Dharmalingam was arrested for allegedly trafficking 42.72g of heroin in Singapore while entering Singapore from Malaysia at Woodlands Checkpoint with a bundle of heroin strapped to his thigh. Nagaenthran confessed to committing the crime, but he gave statements claiming that he was ordered to commit the crime out of duress by an alleged mastermind who assaulted him and threatened to kill his girlfriend, and also claimed he did so to get money to pay off his debts. Nagaenthran was convicted and sentenced to death in 2010, and later, when changes to the law took effect in January 2013, Nagaenthran applied for re-sentencing but he lost his appeals in 2019, and he was initially set to be executed on 10 November 2021. There were local and international calls to the government to not execute Nagaenthran based on his alleged intellectual disability. Due to Nagaenthran tested positive for COVID-19, he was not yet executed and he was given time to recover before his final appeal can proceed and it will be decided on 30 November 2021 if he can be executed. The court date is later postponed to January 2022. The appeal was finally heard on 1 March 2022, and it was dismissed on 29 March 2022. After which, Nagaenthran, then 34 years old, was eventually hanged on 27 April 2022.

2010s

2010 
 29 May 2010: In a case known as the 2010 Kallang slashing, four Malaysians from Sarawak – 21-year-old Micheal Garing, 31-year-old Tony Anak Imba, 20-year-old Hairee Landak and 19-year-old Donny Meluda – committed a series of armed robberies, causing three victims to sustain serious injuries. They also targeted their fourth victim, 41-year-old construction worker Shanmuganathan Dillidurai, by brutally attacking him as they robbed him. Shanmuganathan succumbed to his injuries. Micheal, Tony and Hairee were arrested after the crime, while Donny fled to Malaysia and was eventually arrested in 2017. On 20 April 2015, High Court judge Choo Han Teck found Micheal and Tony guilty of murder and sentenced the former to death while sentencing the latter to life imprisonment and 24 strokes of the cane. Micheal appealed against his death sentence while the prosecution pressed for Tony to receive the death penalty too; the Court of Appeal turned down both appeals. Micheal was hanged on 22 March 2019 after President Halimah binte Yacob turned down his appeal for clemency. Hairee and Donny were each sentenced to 33 years' imprisonment and 24 strokes of the cane for multiple charges of armed robbery with hurt in 2013 and 2018 respectively.
 6 July 2010: 56-year-old Singaporean Abdul Kahar Othman, who was previously released in 2005 after serving ten years of preventive detention, was re-arrested for trafficking a total of 66.77 grams of diamorphine. Abdul Kahar, who had been going in and out of prison since age 18 for drug offences, was charged and convicted in 2013, and sentenced to death in 2015 after the High Court deemed he was not a courier, making him ineligible for the alternative penalty of life imprisonment. While on death row, Abdul Kahar appealed several times against the death penalty, but the courts upheld his sentence and dismissed all his appeals. Abdul Kahar spent seven years on death row before his death warrant was finalized, and 68-year-old Abdul Kahar was hanged at dawn on 30 March 2022; his execution was the first to be conducted in Singapore since 2019, and also the first execution authorised during the COVID-19 pandemic in Singapore.
 September 2010: During a Mid Autumn Festival night, 20-year-old National Serviceman Soh Wee Kian stabbed Hoe Hong Lin and killed her. Soh was also involved in the grievous assault case of How Poh Ling four months earlier, and two other hurt-related incidents of females. Soh was initially charged with murder but due to an adjustment disorder with a depressed mood, he was found guilty of both culpable homicide and inflicting grievous hurt, and sentenced to life imprisonment on 22 August 2013; no caning is given due to his psychiatric conditions.

 30 October 2010: Republic Polytechnic student Darren Ng Wei Jie was involved in a 'staring' incident with a group of teenage gang members. The gang members viciously attacked him at Downtown East in Pasir Ris, and he later died of his injuries in Changi General Hospital. A total of 12 youths were arrested and charged with rioting. Among these 12 youths, five of them – 18-year-old Stilwell Ong Keat Pin, 20-year-old Ho Wui Ming, 19-year-old Chen Wei Zhen, 18-year-old Edward Tay Wei Loong and 16-year-old Louis Tong Qing Yao – were initially charged with murder but later had their charges reduced to culpable homicide not amounting to murder. High Court judge Tay Yong Kwang thus sentenced them as follows: Ong was sentenced to 12 years' jail and 12 strokes of the cane; Ho was sentenced to 11 years and three months' jail and 10 strokes of the cane; Chen and Tay were each sentenced to 10 years' jail and 10 strokes of the cane; while Tong was sentenced to eight years' jail and 11 strokes of the cane. The other seven youths were also sentenced to jail terms ranging between three years and three months and six years and three months, as well as caning between three and six strokes for rioting and other unrelated minor offences.

2011 
 18 January 2011: 26-year-old Datchinamurthy Kataiah, together with a Singaporean accomplice Christeen Jayamany, were arrested at the Woodlands Checkpoint by the Singapore authorities for allegedly trafficking over 44.96g of heroin across the border of Singapore from Malaysia. On 8 May 2015, Christeen, who was certified as a courier and had given substantive assistance to the authorities in tackling drug offences, was spared the gallows and she was therefore sentenced to life imprisonment, with effect from the date of her arrest. Christeen also did not receive caning since she was a female. Datchinamurthy, on the other hand, was sentenced to death after he failed to prove himself as a courier. Datchinamurthy lost his appeals and he also filed other legal lawsuits to challenge his death sentence. Originally scheduled to be executed on 29 April 2022, Datchinamurthy obtained a stay of execution to allow him to continue to live while his current lawsuit is pending in the courts.
 19 September 2011: 39-year-old Khoo Joo Huat, the leader of an unlicensed money-lending syndicate, was found guilty of 116 charges of illegal money-lending and six charges of corruption. District judge Eddy Tham thus sentenced Khoo to five years and five months' imprisonment, a fine of S$300,000 and 21 strokes of the cane. At the time of his arrest, Khoo had over S$450,000 hidden in two safes in a secret room in his condominium unit at Jalan Loyang Besar. His five accomplices – Koh Chew Hwee, Tok Leong Hai, Kwek Sir Huat, Ho Yew Fei and Loy Jit Chan – were also arrested and each sentenced to imprisonment terms of between 14 and 52 months. Among them, Tok, Kwek, Koh and Loy were fined between S$250,000 and S$455,000 each; Tok and Ho were also each sentenced to 12 strokes of the cane.
 28 December 2011: In a high-profile case involving an online vice syndicate, 48 men were charged for having sex with an underage prostitute. The case started with an eight-hour police raid on 28 December 2011 to crack down on an online vice ring. Subsequent investigations revealed that 39-year-old Tang Boon Thiew, who operated the online vice ring, had earned more than S$370,000 from sexual services provided by the prostitutes he hired. Among them, there was a 17-year-old girl from China whom Tang had forced into prostitution and had represented online as 18 years old. On 11 January 2013, Tang was sentenced by senior district judge See Kee Oon to 58 months' imprisonment and a S$90,000 fine for 20 vice-related charges. Throughout the trial, which lasted from 2012 to 2015, the case made headlines in Singapore because there were high-profile individuals, top civil servants, government scholarship holders, businessmen and managers among the 48 accused, including some foreigners. The 48 accused included UBS banker Juerg Buergin; Shaw Organisation scion Howard Shaw Chai Li; RSN scholar and captain Chan Wei Kiat; army lieutenant-colonel Emlyn Thomas Thariyan; police superintendent Tan Wee Kiat; NEA in-house lawyer Chia Kok Peng; MOE scholar and teacher Chua Ren Cheng; and Pei Chun Public School principal Lee Lip Hong.

2012 
 30–31 March 2012: 37-year-old Gabriel Lee Haw Ling killed and decapitated his fiancée, 24-year-old Elsie Lie Lek Chee, in their Jurong West rented room after believing that she was possessed by evil spirits. Lee was initially charged with murder, but the charge was reduced to culpable homicide not amounting to murder after he was diagnosed to be suffering from a brief psychotic disorder when he killed Lie. He pleaded guilty and was sentenced on 24 February 2017 by High Court judge Pang Khang Chau to 10 years' imprisonment.
 13 April 2012: Nazeri Lajim, a 54-year-old Singaporean and drug addict, was arrested for trafficking 33.89g of diamorphine at Far East Shopping Centre in Orchard Road. 24-year-old Dominic Martin Fernandez, a Malaysian who delivered the drugs to Nazeri, was caught shortly after he parted ways with Nazeri. After a trial that dragged on for two years, Dominic and Nazeri were both found guilty of drug trafficking on 8 August 2017. Dominic was certified as a courier and sentenced to life imprisonment and 15 strokes of the cane, while Nazeri was sentenced to death after Senior Judge Kan Ting Chiu judging him as not a courier, in addition to his earlier rejection of Nazeri's defence that most of the drugs were for his own consumption. Nazeri lost his appeals and two clemency petitions, and eventually executed on 22 July 2022.
 26 June 2012: Six leaders of City Harvest Church – senior pastor Kong Hee, board member Chew Eng Han, deputy senior pastor Tan Ye Peng, finance manager Serina Wee Gek Yin, management board secretary John Lam Leng Hung, and finance manager Sharon Tan Shao Yuen – were arrested for misuse of church funds. They were subsequently found guilty of criminal breach of trust by presiding judge See Kee Oon on 21 October 2015 and sentenced to jail terms of between 21 months and eight years. Due to a legal technicality, their original sentences were reduced upon appeal to a five-judge Court of Appeal on 7 April 2017. Kong was sentenced to three years and six months in jail; Chew was sentenced to three years and four months in jail; Tan Ye Peng was sentenced to three years and two months in jail; Wee was sentenced to two years and six months in jail; Lam was sentenced to one year and six months in jail; and Sharon Tan was sentenced to seven months in jail. After the sentences were announced, Law Minister K. Shanmugam expressed his disappointment at the verdict but stated that the court's decision has to be respected. The government later reviewed the applicable laws to plug the legal technicality.
 10 September 2012: At Little India's Dunlop Street, three Indian nationals and remittance agents - Antony Savarimuthu, Gulam Hussain Jalaludeen and Abuasanar Kamarulzaman - were robbed by three robbers who posed as police officers and a total of approximately S$1.3 million were taken from the victims. The gang robbery was planned by Singaporean taxi driver and police reservist, 33-year-old Mohammad Ansari s/o Abdul Hussain, who collaborated with four other men - two Singaporeans, 33-year-old Magesan s/o Ramasamy (Ansari's childhood friend and music teacher) and 29-year-old Mohamed Faizal s/o Ajmalhan (a moneychanger), and two Indian foreign workers, 34-year-old Arunachalam s/o Lakshmanan and 35-year-old Chinnaya Antony Samy - to rob the three agents of their money; Ansari, Magesan and Faizal were the three who posed as police officers when taking the agents hostage and robbing them while both Arunachalam and Chinnaya acted as lookouts. All five suspects were arrested shortly after for the gang robbery and two other unrelated robbery cases. More than $900,000 were later recovered by the police while the remaining $300,000 remained missing. Ansari, the mastermind of the robbery, was the only one out of the five to plead guilty to charges of gang robbery and impersonating a policeman, and sentenced to eight years' imprisonment and 12 strokes of the cane on 4 September 2013. The remaining four robbers claimed trial and District Judge Low Wee Ping later found them guilty of the impersonation and gang robbery charges on 30 June 2015. Magesan was sentenced to ten years and six months' jail, and Faizal was sentenced to ten years and four months in jail, while both Chinnaya and Arunachalam were each sentenced to a jail term of ten years. District judge Low also ordered that each of the four remaining convicts should receive the maximum of 24 strokes of the cane for their respective roles in the robbery. The three robbery victims, meanwhile, who were found to be operating their remittance business without a legal license, were jailed between ten weeks and ten months and fined between S$70,000 and S$100,000 for charges of operating an illegal remittance business.

2013 
 15 June 2013: A group of gang members attacked 20-year-old Wilson Siau with parangs outside Cathay Cineleisure Orchard at around 9:12 pm purportedly because of his "cocky" manner of walking, particularly the way he swung his arms. The attack, which took place in full view of passers-by, left Siau bleeding profusely. Siau was immediately rushed to Singapore General Hospital and he survived the slashing after undergoing surgery and treatment. Nine men were subsequently arrested, charged in court, and convicted of rioting and being members of an unlawful assembly. Some of the nine were named in news reports: 19-year-old Muhamad Hardi Azaman was charged on 26 June 2013. On 25 November 2013, 19-year-old Muhammad Hasnul Redha Abdullah was sentenced to three years' imprisonment and six strokes of the cane; 20-year-old Muhammad Fahmi Razali was sentenced to three years and six months' imprisonment and six strokes of the cane; and 21-year-old Muhammad Nazmir Osman was sentenced to two years and six months' imprisonment and four strokes of the cane. Two others – Muhammad Farin Zulkeple and Muhammad Ridzuan Said – pleaded guilty and were assessed for their suitability for reformative training. On 7 April 2016, a 26-year-old Mizra Abdul Azman was sentenced to five years' imprisonment and six strokes of the cane for another slashing while he was out on bail following his arrest for the 2013 incident at Cineleisure.
 10 July 2013: In a case known as the Kovan double murders, 34-year-old Iskandar bin Rahmat, a former policeman, killed 67-year-old Tan Boon Sin and his 42-year-old son, Tan Chee Heong. Tan Boon Sin's body was found in his home at Hillside Drive while Tan Chee Heong's body was dragged under a car for 1 km from the home before being dislodged outside Kovan MRT station. Iskandar, who had joined the Singapore Police Force in 1999, fled to Malaysia shortly after committing the crime. He was arrested in Johor Bahru two days later, extradited back to Singapore and charged with murder on 15 July 2013. As he was facing financial difficulties and bankruptcy which could possibly cost him his job, Iskandar hatched a plan to rob the elder Tan in order to settle his debts, which led to the double murders. High Court judge Tay Yong Kwang found Iskandar guilty of murder on 4 December 2015 and sentenced him to death, rejecting Iskandar's claims of self-defence and that the killings was a result of a robbery gone wrong; the injuries on the victims were inflicted on vital parts of the body and the force used were too excessive for self-defence, which clearly showed that Iskandar had intended to cause death and silence the victims. Iskandar's appeal to the Court of Appeal was dismissed on 3 February 2017, while his plea for clemency to President Halimah binte Yacob was also turned down in July 2019. , Iskandar is still held on death row in Changi Prison due to unsettled legal issues.
 24 October 2013: Two drug traffickers - 35-year-old Singaporean Mohamad Yazid Md Yusof and 23-year-old Pahang-born Malaysian Kalwant Singh Jogindar Singh - were arrested by the Central Narcotics Bureau at a carpark in Woodlands Drive, and over 120g of diamorphine were found in Yazid's motorcycle while another 60g of diamorphine were discovered in Kalwant's possession as well. Based on Yazid's later confession, the police investigated and discovered the involvement of a third man who ordered Yazid to smuggle and collect the drugs from Kalwant for trafficking. Yazid's boss, 42-year-old Singaporean Norasharee Gous, was arrested two years later in July 2015. A year later, in June 2016, Yazid was sentenced to life imprisonment and 15 strokes of the cane after the prosecution certified him as a courier, while both Norasharee (who insisted his innocence and put up an alibi defence) and Kalwant (who denied having any knowledge of the drugs) were sentenced to death after the High Court rejected their defences and found them guilty. After several appeals (including an unsuccessful re-trial of Norasharee) and failed pleas for clemency, both 31-year-old Kalwant and 48-year-old Norasharee were hanged at dawn in Changi Prison on 7 July 2022.

 8 December 2013: A riot broke out in Little India shortly after 33-year-old Sakthivel Kumaravelu, a construction worker from India, was killed in a traffic accident. This was the first time a riot happened in Singapore since the 1969 race riots. Over 20 men from Bangladesh and India were charged for their respective roles in the riot and sentenced to jail terms; three of them were also each sentenced to three strokes of the cane. In the aftermath of the riot, the Singapore government passed the Liquor Control (Supply and Consumption) Act 2015 to regulate the supply and consumption of liquor at public places, since the investigations had revealed that many of the rioters were drunk when the riot occurred. The riot also drew public attention to various social issues in Singapore, including ongoing ethnic tensions, rising income inequality, Singapore's heavy reliance on foreign labour, as well as the working conditions of migrant workers.
 9 December 2013: 46-year-old P Mageswaran, an ex-convict who had a long criminal record of rape, theft and robbery crimes since 1991 and recently released from prison after serving a six-year jail term with caning of 24 strokes for previous serial robberies, had re-offended by committing robbery in the Yishun home of his employer's 62-year-old mother Kanne Lactmy. This time, he murdered the elderly woman during the course of robbery, in which he took away the victim's jewellery to pawn for RM26,300 to pay off his new flat's installment payment. Mageswaran was arrested eight days later and charged with murder, which was later reduced to culpable homicide not amounting to murder. After Mageswaran was tried and convicted in May 2017, the prosecution described the case as one of the worst types of culpable homicide and sought the maximum sentence of life imprisonment for Mageswaran given his long criminal record and the cold-blooded, calculated nature of the killing, while the defence sought 12 years' of imprisonment given that Mageswaran was allegedly suffering from low IQ and it affected his thinking and conduct at the time of the crime. After hearing the submissions, High Court judge Hoo Sheau Peng sentenced 50-year-old Mageswaran on 21 July 2017 to 18 years' imprisonment, since she did not agree that it was the worst type of culpable homicide given the lack of premeditation to kill and accepted that it was a robbery gone wrong. Mageswaran was not caned since he reached 50 years old, and the judge did not impose an extra jail term of six months in lieu of caning despite the prosecution's arguments. Later, not only did Mageswaran's appeal to reduce his 18-year sentence failed, the prosecution's appeal to increase the sentence from 18 years to life was also dismissed by the Court of Appeal on 11 April 2019.
 12 December 2013: 33-year-old Indian national Jasvinder Kaur's dismembered body was found in the Whampoa River. Her husband, 33-year-old Indian national Harvinder Singh, is suspected to have killed her. 25-year-old Gursharan Singh was arrested for assisting Harvinder Singh in disposing of the body and failing to report to the police. He was sentenced to 30 months' imprisonment in April 2015. A coroner's report had issued a verdict of murder, effectively finding Harvinder Singh guilty of murder in the case of his wife's death, as the manner of disposal of the headless corpse and circumstances of the crime was well-organised and did not indicate any signs of a crime of passion. , Harvinder Singh is still on the run and on Interpol's wanted list.
 28–29 December 2013: 37-year-old Dexmon Chua Yizhi was found dead in Lim Chu Kang on 1 January 2014. Two suspects, 53-year-old Chia Kee Chen and 64-year-old Chua Leong Aik, were arrested and charged with murder. A third suspect, Djatmiko Febri Irwansyah (late 20s), had fled Singapore. It was revealed that Dexmon Chua had an affair with Chia's wife, so Chia had collaborated with Chua Leong Aik and Febri to murder Dexmon Chua in revenge. On 8 January 2016, Chua Leong Aik, who drove the vehicle, was sentenced to five years' imprisonment for his role in the murder. On 4 August 2017, Chia was convicted of murder and sentenced to life imprisonment by High Court judge Choo Han Teck. The prosecution appealed for Chia to be given the death penalty, arguing that the murder was premeditated and had been carried out in a merciless, cruel and vicious manner demonstrating a blatant disregard for human life. On 27 June 2018, the Court of Appeal overturned Chia's life sentence and sentenced him to death. , Djatmiko Febri Irwansyah is still on the run.

2014 
 8 January 2014: 41-year-old Lee Sze Yong, a former salesman, hatched a plot with his accomplice, 50-year-old Heng Chen Boon, to kidnap 79-year-old Ng Lye Poh, the mother of the three founders of the supermarket chain Sheng Siong. Having conducted reconnaissance before the kidnapping, Lee approached Ng at an overhead bridge in Hougang on the morning of 8 January 2014 and lied to her that her eldest son, Lim Hock Chee, the CEO of Sheng Siong, had collapsed at his workplace. Lee then tricked Ng into getting into a car and blindfolded her while driving her around. Lee met Heng later and they demanded S$20 million in ransom. The police tracked down and arrested the two men before they got the ransom. Lee and Heng were charged with kidnapping on 10 January 2014. Heng was sentenced to three years in jail in 2015 for abetting the kidnapping, and released in January 2016 on remission. On 1 December 2016, Lee, who had asked for the death penalty, was sentenced by High Court judge Chan Seng Onn to life imprisonment and three strokes of the cane.
 28 May 2014: 44-year-old serial rapist Azuar Ahamad, who spiked his victims' drinks with sleeping pills before raping them, was sentenced to a total of 37 years and six months' imprisonment and 24 strokes of the cane. Azuar committed various sexual offences against 22 women in 2008 and 2009 after getting to know them online, and after his arrest, he was tried and pleaded guilty in 2012. In sentencing Azuar to a lengthy jail term, High Court judge Chan Seng Onn harshly criticized Azuar for his lack of remorse and the prosecution stated that this case was committed by the "worst serial rapist ever to be dealt with in Singapore".
 11 June 2014: Two Pakistani nationals – 43-year-old Rasheed Muhammad and 25-year-old Ramzan Rizwan – strangled and killed their roommate, 59-year-old Muhammad Noor, by suffocating and strangling him. They attempted to get rid of his body by dismembering it and stashing the torso and legs in two suitcases. One of the suitcases was found at Syed Alwi Road and the two men were arrested and charged with murder. On 17 February 2017, High Court judge Choo Han Teck found Rasheed and Ramzan guilty of murder and sentenced them to death. The Court of Appeal dismissed their appeals on 28 September 2017 and they were hanged in early 2018.
 August 2014: Four-year-old Mohammad Airyl Amirul Haziq Mohamed Ariff died from a fractured skull four days after he was taken to hospital. Airyl's mother, Noraidah Mohd Yussof (who also had one daughter), had severely beaten him for not able to recite the numbers 11 to 18 in Malay, and Noraidah had also abused the child for two years since March 2012. Noraidah, who was a 32-year-old divorcee at the time of her arrest, was charged with murder but in July 2016, Noraidah was consequently found guilty of voluntarily causing grievous hurt and child abuse, and she was sentenced to eight years' imprisonment by the High Court, which rejected Noraidah's defence of diminished responsibility by Asperger's Syndrome. However, a year later, the Court of Appeal, upon looking through the prosecution's appeal, found Noraidah's eight-year sentence manifestly inadequate due to the aggravating circumstances of the case (including the boy's young age and Noraidah's cruelty at the time of the crime) and thus increased Noraidah's jail term to 14 years and six months' imprisonment. The case of Airyl's death also prompted the Court of Appeal to call for lawmakers to allow judges to mete out enhanced sentences for certain crimes against vulnerable victims by 1.5 times the maximum penalty prescribed.
 3 September 2014: 27-year-old Malaysian Pannir Selvam Pranthaman was arrested for importing 51.84g of heroin into Singapore. Pannir was found guilty in 2017 and sentenced to death as he was not certified to be a courier. After his appeal was dismissed in February 2018, Pannir and his family submitted various clemency petitions, which were all rejected on 17 May 2019. He was originally due to hang on 24 May 2019, but the execution was postponed due to a last-minute appeal to challenge the clemency outcome and the decision of the prosecution to not certify him as a courier, but it was rejected by the High Court in February 2020, and the legal challenge against the 2019 appeal's rejection is also dismissed by the Court of Appeal on 26 November 2021. As of 2022, Pannir is currently on death row awaiting execution.
 September 2014: 40-year-old Yang Yin, a tour guide from Nanjing, China, was arrested after a police report was made against him by Hedy Mok (aged 69 in 2022), the niece and guardian of retired physiotherapist Chung Khin Chun (aged 95 in 2022), whom Yang first met in 2008 and took care of. Yang misappropriated $500,000 in February 2010 and $600,000 in January 2012 from Chung, whom he claimed wanted him to be her grandson, since she was childless and her husband and doctor Chou Sip King died in 2007. Yang, who was married with two children back in China, also obtained permanent residency in 2011 and lasting power of attorney in 2012 through his manipulation and cheating of Chung and even made her set a will that Yang was to inherit her assets - estimated to be worth $40 million - in 2010. The turn of events made Chung's relatives and niece suspected Yang was up to no good, and finally, he was arrested and his crimes came to light in September 2014. Yang, who was held in remand since 31 October 2014, was brought to trial in September 2016, and he pleaded guilty to all the charges he faced for cheating Chung. He was sentenced by District Judge Bala Reddy to a total of eight years and two months' imprisonment - which consisted of six years' jail for the misappropriation of Chung's money and a consecutive prison term of 26 months for falsifying his immigration status. On 3 March 2017, the prosecution's appeal was heard and allowed in the High Court by Judge of Appeal Tay Yong Kwang, who increased Yang's six-year sentence for cheating to nine years based on the highly aggravating nature of Yang's crimes, his meticulous efforts of manipulating Chung and the amount of money misappropriated. The enhancement of Yang's sentence meant that Yang would need to serve a total of 11 years and two months' imprisonment. Yang, whose sentence was backdated to his date of remand (31 October 2014), was released early by parole in April 2022 after serving two-thirds of his jail term due to good behaviour. Yang, now 48 years old, was deported to China two months later on 9 June 2022, and barred from re-entering Singapore.
 20 November 2014: 40-year-old Jackson Lim Hou Peng was arrested at his Ang Mo Kio flat for the alleged murder of his girlfriend, 32-year-old Vietnamese national Tran Cam Ny. Lim, who was previously jailed for drug consumption, faced an additional charge of consuming methamphetamine. On 14 March 2016, his murder charge was reduced to culpable homicide not amounting to murder on the account that he was suffering from diminished responsibility due to the effects of drugs, and that he had no intention to kill when he covered Tran's mouth to stop her from screaming. Based on these mitigating factors, in addition to the fact that Lim had called for medical assistance and tried to resuscitate Tran upon discovering that she was not breathing, High Court judge Tay Yong Kwang sentenced Lim to a total of nine years and six months' imprisonment and three strokes of the cane. The case was re-enacted in the crime show The Convict, in which Lim and Tran's names were changed to protect their privacy.
 11 December 2014: 26-year-old Malaysian Gobi Avedian, a security guard working in Singapore, was arrested at the Woodlands Checkpoint for trafficking over 40.22g of heroin. Gobi recounted in his trial that he needed money to pay for his daughter's medical fees, so he accepted his friend Vinod's offer to deliver the drugs, but he did not know it was heroin; his friends assured him that the drugs were just mild "disco drugs" mixed with chocolate. In May 2017, the High Court sentenced Gobi to 15 years' imprisonment and ten strokes of the cane for a lower charge of attempted importation of a Class C drug. However, upon the prosecution's appeal, in October 2018, Gobi was sentenced to death for the original charge by the Court of Appeal. Gobi's clemency appeal was later dismissed in July 2019, and after an unsuccessful February 2020 appeal, Gobi appealed to re-open his case in light of a new landmark ruling, which clarifies the "willful blindness" and "presumption of knowledge" principles in Singapore's drug laws. The Court of Appeal eventually re-opened the case, and after reviewing it, they decided to overturn Gobi's death penalty in October 2020 and instead, restored his original 15-year sentence and caning for his 2017 original conviction by the High Court.

2015 
 20 March 2015: 31-year-old Malaysian engineer Yap Weng Wah was convicted of 76 sexual offences committed against 31 pubescent boys aged between 11 and 15 whom he met through online social networking. Yap's sexual rampage on his victims, which lasted from November 2009 to June 2012, ended with his arrest at his Yishun apartment in September 2012 after the sister of one of his victims made a police report. When the police raided the apartment, they found more than 2,000 videos of Yap having sex with boys on his laptop. He was also found to have also raped 14 more boys in Malaysia. The charges against Yap involved him performing oral sex on or sodomising 30 of his victims. The Institute of Mental Health released a diagnosis report that Yap was suffering from hebephilia, a type of sexual preference for early adolescent children between 11 and 14 years of age. Yap, who pleaded guilty to 12 counts of sexual penetration with a minor and have 64 other charges taken into consideration during sentencing, was described by the prosecution as a "clear and present danger to society". In view of his high propensity to re-offend and other aggravating factors, High Court judge Woo Bih Li sentenced Yap to 30 years' imprisonment and 24 strokes of the cane.
 13 April 2015: A couple – Tan Hui Zhen and Pua Hak Chuan – had cruelly abused their flatmate, 26-year-old Annie Ee Yu Lian, over eight months from August 2014 until her death on 13 April 2015. Ee, who was intellectual disabled and estranged from her family, had moved in to live with the couple in 2013. Throughout the eight months, the couple had beaten her frequently and the beatings had increased in intensity over time, with some sessions lasting up to two hours. As a result, Ee had difficulty walking, standing and breathing, and had become incontinent in the days leading to her death. She had been repeatedly hit with a large roll of shrink wrap weighing up to 1 kg, and had a plastic dustbin smashed over her with such force that the dustbin cracked. Despite the abuse, she suffered in silence and tried to hide her injuries from her colleagues and neighbours when they asked her. An autopsy report revealed that she suffered 12 fractured ribs, seven fractured vertebrae, a ruptured stomach and a body full of blisters and bruises; she had died of acute fat embolism caused by the beatings. The couple were initially charged with murder, but had their charges reduced to causing grievous hurt with a weapon, among others. On 1 December 2017, High Court judge Hoo Sheau Peng sentenced a 33-year-old Tan to 16 years and six months in jail, and a 38-year-old Pua to 14 years in jail and 14 strokes of the cane.
 1 June 2015: A red Subaru Impreza driven by 34-year-old Mohamed Taufik bin Zahar took an incorrect turn and ended up at a high security checkpoint near the Shangri-La Hotel where the Shangri-La Dialogue was held. When the police ordered Taufik to open the car boot for checks, he sped up and crashed the car through concrete barriers despite repeated warnings to stop. The police then opened fire and fatally shot Taufik through the windscreen, causing the car to come to a halt. On 22 April 2016, state coroner Marvin Bay ruled that Taufik's death was a "lawful killing".
 20 June 2015: 24-year-old Muhammad Iskandar bin Sa'at was arrested on 19 June 2015 for the theft of a motor vehicle and escorted by the police to Khoo Teck Puat Hospital the next day for a medical examination after he claimed that he had chest pain. After his grip restraints were loosened on his left arm and right wrist for blood drawing and minimising discomfort respectively, Iskandar attacked police staff sergeant Muhammad Sadli bin Razali and attempted to escape. During the scuffle, Iskandar grabbed Sadli's T-baton and used it to hit him at least 13 times. He also snatched Sadli's revolver and managed to fire three shots, injuring Sadli's left thumb and right foot. Sadli and two paramedics eventually subdued and pinned down Iskandar. On 22 June 2015, Iskandar was charged with unlawful discharge of a firearm under the Arms Offences Act, which carries the mandatory death penalty. However, the charge was later reduced to unlawful possession of a firearm for causing hurt to a public servant, to which Iskandar pleaded guilty. On 19 March 2018, High Court judge Chan Seng Onn sentenced Iskandar to life imprisonment and 18 strokes of the cane.
 26 August 2015: Zackeer Abbass Khan, the owner of the murtabak restaurant Zam Zam at North Bridge Road, allegedly paid S$2,000 to Anwer Ambiya Kadir Maideen, his friend who was also a headman of the Sio Ang Koon gang, to hire a hitman, Joshua Navindran Surainthiran, to attack Liakath Ali Mohamed Ibrahim, the supervisor of the neighbouring Victory Restaurant. Liakath survived the slashing with a permanent scar on his face. On 29 November 2016, a 23-year-old Joshua was sentenced to six years and six months' imprisonment and six strokes of the cane for causing grievous hurt, among other charges. Zackeer, along with Anwer and four others, were charged with engaging in a conspiracy to cause grievous hurt and/or criminal intimidation. On 11 May 2020, district judge Mathew Joseph found a 49-year-old Zackeer guilty of conspiring to cause grievous hurt and sentenced him to six years' imprisonment and six strokes of the cane. A 50-year-old Anwer, who served as the middleman in the scheme, was sentenced to five years and six months' imprisonment.
 31 August 2015: Syed Maffi Hasan, a 24-year-old jobless Singaporean, was arguing with his 23-year-old friend Atika Dolkifli at a multistorey carpark at Toa Payoh over the repair costs of an i-phone 5 that went faulty after Atika purhcased it for Syed Maffi to use. In a fit of rage, Syed Maffi pushed Atika, causing her to fall and hit the back of her head on a flight of stairs. After which, he threw the unconscious Atika off the carpark and even disposed of her belongings; Atika died from the fall. Syed Maffi was arrested and charged with murder, and after he pleaded guilty in May 2019, Syed Maffi was sentenced to life imprisonment and 12 strokes of the cane on 4 July 2019.
 23 November 2015: Just a month before his third birthday, two-year-old Mohamad Daniel bin Mohamad Nasser was found dead in his home, and he was allegedly severely abused by his mother Zaidah (41 years old) and her boyfriend Zaini Jamari (46 years old). Both were arrested and charged with the fatal abuse of Daniel. Instances of the couple's abuse of the boy include forcing Daniel to stand with his hands on his head wearing only a nappy, forced him to eat spoonfuls of dried chilli and stamped on his chest for months till he died. Daniel's father Mohamad Nasser bin Abdul Gani, who was in prison and spent a year searching for his son before receiving news of his death, never got to know his son and only got to see and touch him the first time he saw his son's corpse, which was riddled with over 41 external injuries, including a fatal head injury which was certified to be the cause of Daniel's death. The case was shocking to the extent that several outraged netizens created a petition to the courts for the couple to receive the death penalty. On 24 June 2015, Zaidah and Zaini were found guilty of voluntarily causing grievous hurt and more than 20 charges of child abuse, and on 5 July 2016, Zaidah was sentenced to 11 years' imprisonment while Zaini received 12 strokes of the cane and a simultaneous jail term of ten years, much to the displeasure and sadness of Daniel's father and his paternal relatives, who felt the sentences were too light. District judge Bala Reddy, who sentenced the couple, admonished both of them for their ruthless and callous conduct, and for their lack of remorse. Minister of Social and Family Development (MSF) Tan Chuan-jin, who noted the tragic circumstances and severity of the case, called for all Singaporeans to be more mindful of possible signs of child abuse from their neighbours.

2016 
 19 February 2016: 25-year-old Muhammad Khairulanwar Bin Rohmat was sentenced by district judge Mathew Joseph to a total of six years and three months' imprisonment and fined S$30,000 for recruiting two underage girls aged 15 and 16 for sexual exploitation and luring them into prostitution. He also admitted to sexual penetration of a minor under 16 years of age with consent. Khairulanwar was the first person to be tried and convicted under the Prevention of Human Trafficking Act 2015.
 21 March 2016: Known as the Circuit Road flat murder, 47-year-old Malaysian national Boh Soon Ho was charged on 7 April 2016 for strangling his 28-year-old girlfriend, Chinese national Zhang Huaxiang; he also had sex with the corpse after he killed her, supposedly over his anger that Zhang was allegedly seeing other men. He fled to Malaysia before he was arrested by the Royal Malaysia Police and brought back to Singapore to face trial. On 8 February 2020, High Court judge Pang Khang Chau found a 51-year-old Boh guilty of murder and sentenced him to life imprisonment. Boh's appeal was also dismissed in October 2020.
 April 2016: 52-year-old Lim Hong Liang engaged his 26-year-old nephew Ron Lim De Mai and a middleman Ong Hong Chye to hire several men to attack 35-year-old Joshua Koh Kian Yong, the boyfriend of Lim Hong Liang's mistress, 27-year-old Audrey Chen Ying Fang. The attackers were subsequently arrested, convicted and sentenced to jail terms of between 15 months and 14 years and six months, as well as caning. Ron Lim was sentenced to three years' imprisonment and four strokes of the cane. Lim Hong Liang and Ong Hock Chye were found guilty in 2019 and respectively sentenced to six years' imprisonment and five years and six months' imprisonment. Both were granted bail while waiting for the outcomes of the appeals against the district courts' verdicts. Ong later lost his appeal and received an additional three years and six months' jail term for committing another offence while out on bail. Lim was granted a re-trial by the High Court and eventually granted a discharge not amounting to an acquittal on the conditions that he must not reoffend for the next 36 months and having to compensate Koh.
 April-May 2016: Russian Nationals Logachev Vladislav and Egorov Andrei, together with Czech Radoslav Skubnik and 3 female accomplices, used mobile phones to predict winning sequences at Marina Bay Sands and Resorts World Sentosa casinos. All 6 were arrested on 8 May 2016 in an operation by the Casino Crime Investigation Branch. On 28 June 2016, Skubnik was sentenced to 1 year 10 months imprisonment. Separately, on 12 April 2017, Logachev and Egorov were sentenced to 3 years 9 months and 2 years 6 months respectively. Logachev appealed and his sentence was reduced to 3 years and 2 months on 19 January 2018. It is not known what happened to the female accomplices.
 7 June 2016: Daryati, a 23-year-old Indonesian domestic worker, stabbed her 59-year-old employer Seow Kim Choo to death in her home at Telok Kurau. She also inflicted two neck wounds on Seow's husband, 57-year-old Ong Thiam Soon, before he managed to restrain her and went out to call for help. Daryati was arrested and charged with murder. At her trial, Daryati claimed that she had confronted Seow to get back her passport, which Seow kept in a safe, and wanted to steal money from a locked drawer so that she could return to Indonesia. In March 2020, the prosecution amended the original murder charge to a lesser charge of murder and did not seek the death penalty. Daryati initially pleaded guilty to the lesser charge of murder but retracted her plea in September 2020 and attempted to escape the murder charge with a defence of diminished responsibility. High Court judge Valerie Thean found Daryati guilty of murder and sentenced her to life imprisonment on 23 April 2021. On 31 March 2022, Daryati's appeal against her conviction was dismissed, thereby finalizing her life sentence and she is currently in prison serving her sentence.
 7 July 2016: 27-year-old Canadian national David James Roach robbed a Standard Chartered Singapore bank in Holland Village. He presented a note to the bank teller stating that he had a weapon before making off with S$30,000. After the robbery, Roach immediately fled to Bangkok, where was subsequently charged with violating Thai exchange control laws and money laundering, and sentenced to 14 months in jail. Singapore was unsuccessful at requesting Roach's extradition from Thailand as the two countries have no relevant treaty. Upon his release on 11 January 2018, Roach was deported to Canada via the United Kingdom. Singapore requested Roach's extradition from the United Kingdom on the same day, which led to Roach being detained while in transit at London. To secure the extradition, Singapore assured the United Kingdom that Roach would not be sentenced to caning, a mandatory punishment for robbery under the Singapore Penal Code, if he is found guilty. Roach was extradited on 16 March 2020 from the United Kingdom to Singapore and subsequently charged with robbery and unlawfully removing the money out of Singapore. On 7 July 2021, deputy principal district judge Luke Tan sentenced a 31-year-old Roach to five years' imprisonment and six strokes of the cane for both charges. The Attorney-General's Chambers eventually made arrangements for Roach to have his caning sentence remitted, thus fulfilling the assurance given to the United Kingdom earlier to secure Roach's extradition. No alternative punishment was given to David Roach after his caning was remitted when President Halimah Yacob granted his clemency.
 9 July 2016: 64-year-old Toh Sia Guan allegedly caused the death of 52-year-old Goh Eng Thiam, who was found lying motionless on the floor in a coffee shop at Geylang Lorong 23. It was revealed in the trial that Toh and Goh were engaged in an argument, which spurred Toh into going to a hardware store to procure a knife to fight Goh, therefore inflicting several knife wounds onto Goh and one of them - a knife wound on the right arm - cut through a major blood vessel and result in him bleeding to death. On 2 March 2020, High Court judge Aedit bin Abdullah found Toh guilty of murder and sentenced him to life imprisonment.
 12 July 2016: 48-year-old Leslie Khoo Kwee Hock strangled his girlfriend, 31-year-old Chinese national Cui Yajie, in his car on a quiet road near Gardens by the Bay. He burnt her body in a secluded location in Lim Chu Kang over several days until only a few pieces of charred fabric and a brassiere hook remained. After the police found that Khoo was the last person who interacted with Cui, they arrested Khoo and he led them to where he killed Cui and where he burnt her body. On 19 August 2019, High Court judge Audrey Lim found Khoo guilty of murder and sentenced him to life imprisonment.
 26 July 2016: 24-year-old Piang Ngaih Don, a domestic helper from Myanmar, died after being abused by her employer, Gaiyathiri d/o Murugayan, and Gaiyathiri's mother, Prema d/o S. Naraynasamy, over a period of about nine months. She had been physically assaulted almost daily, forced to use the toilet with the door open, and deliberately starved to the point where she weighed only around 24 kg at the time of her death. On the night of 25 July 2016, Gaiyathiri and Prema had beaten up Piang and tied her hand to a window grille before leaving her on the floor. Piang eventually died in the morning of 26 July 2016 due to hypoxic ischaemic encephalopathy with severe blunt trauma to her neck. An autopsy revealed that she had suffered multiple injuries and was so emaciated and undernourished that she would have died of starvation if the ill-treatment had been prolonged. Gaiyathiri, Prema, and Gaiyathiri's husband, former policeman Kevin Chelvam, were arrested and charged in court for their respective roles in causing Piang's death. In February 2021, Gaiyathiri, who was initially charged with murder, pleaded guilty to reduced charges of culpable homicide, among others, after she qualified for the defence of diminished responsibility. A 2019 report by psychiatrists who assessed her had concluded that she suffered from major depressive disorder and obsessive compulsive personality disorder, which had substantially contributed to her offences. On 22 June 2021, despite the prosecution's arguments for life imprisonment, a 41-year-old Gaiyathiri was sentenced to 30 years' imprisonment by High Court judge See Kee Oon for culpable homicide and voluntarily causing hurt. Gaiyathiri's appeal was dismissed on 29 June 2022. Chelvam had been suspended from the Singapore Police Force and charged on 11 August 2016 for voluntarily causing hurt to Piang and removing evidence, among other charges. Prema was granted a discharge not amounting to an acquittal for murder but she was sentenced to 14 years' imprisonment on 9 January 2023 for 48 charges of maid abuse and causing hurt, and would claim trial to the 49th and final charge of causing evidence of a homicidal case to disappear. , Chelvam's case is still pending in court.
 October 2016: Between 15 and 22 October 2016, an unemployed couple – Ridzuan bin Mega Abdul Rahman and Azlin binte Arujunah – repeatedly splashed hot water on their five-year-old son at their flat in Toa Payoh until he collapsed and eventually died in hospital on 23 October from his scald injuries, which covered about three-quarters of his body. The couple had also committed other acts of abuse against their son, including locking him up in a pet cage, pinching him with a pair of pliers, hitting him with a broom, and burning his palm with a heated spoon. The couple were initially charged with murder, but later had their charges reduced to causing grievous hurt by dangerous means. The prosecutors also described the case as "one of the worst cases of child abuse" in Singapore. On 13 July 2020, High Court judge Valerie Thean sentenced the couple, both aged 28, to 27 years' imprisonment each; Ridzuan was also sentenced to 24 strokes of the cane while Azlin was sentenced to an additional year in jail in lieu of caning since Singapore law does not allow caning for women. On 12 July 2022, the prosecution's appeal against both Ridzuan's sentence and Azlin's conviction was allowed by the Court of Appeal, which consequently increased Ridzuan's original 27-year sentence to life imprisonment for child abuse and grievous hurt, while they found Azlin guilty of the original charge of murder. For the charge of murdering her son, Azlin was sentenced to life imprisonment three months later on 18 October 2022, despite the prosecution strongly urged the Court of Appeal to impose the death penalty on her.
 25 November 2016: 23-year-old Malaysian national Ahmad Muin bin Yaacob robbed 54-year-old Maimunah binte Awang of her jewellery at Tanah Merah Ferry Terminal and killed her by stabbing her with a pair of grass cutters and bludgeoning her on the head until she became motionless. He then abandoned her body in a drain and fled back to Malaysia. Maimunah's body was discovered the next day. The Singapore Police Force enlisted the help of the Royal Malaysia Police to arrest Ahmad on 18 December 2016 and extradite him to Singapore, where he was charged with murder on 21 December 2016. On 4 November 2020, High Court judge Aedit bin Abdullah found Ahmad guilty of murder and sentenced him to life imprisonment and 18 strokes of the cane.

2017 
 20 January 2017: 41-year-old Teo Ghim Heng got into an argument with his pregnant wife, 39-year-old Choong Pei Shan, at their flat in Woodlands. He strangled her and their daughter, four-year-old Teo Zi Ning, and burnt their bodies. Their charred bodies were found eight days later. Teo was charged with the murders of his wife and daughter. He also initially faced a third charge of murder of his unborn child, but the charge was stood down. On 12 November 2020, Teo was found guilty of two counts of murder and sentenced to death by High Court judge Kannan Ramesh. Teo also lost his appeal against the verdict of capital punishment on 23 February 2022, and as a final resort to avoid execution, Teo plans to seek an official pardon from the President of Singapore.
 2 March 2017: 39-year-old American MMA trainer Joshua Robinson was sentenced by district judge Crystal Ong to four years' imprisonment after pleading guilty on 13 February 2017 to four counts of making obscene films and three counts of having consensual sex with minors. Robinson had unprotected sex with two 15-year-old girls on separate occasions in 2013 and 2015 in his apartment at Upper Circular Road, and had filmed the encounters with his mobile phone. On 25 June 2015, after the second girl told her parents and made a police report, the police seized Robinson's computer and portable hard drive and found 5,902 obscene films, of which 321 contained child pornography. On 28 July 2015, while out on bail, Robinson visited a martial arts gym and showed an obscene video to a six-year-old girl while her father was training; the girl told her father later and he called the police. After Robinson was sentenced on 2 March 2017, there was significant public outrage as Robinson was perceived to have received a "light" sentence; some people questioned whether it was because he was a foreigner, while others asked why he was not sentenced to caning. More than 27,000 people signed an online petition calling for a revision of the sentence. On 8 March 2017, the Attorney-General's Chambers stated that the public prosecutor would not be appealing against Robinson's sentence, and explained that the sentence was broadly in line with relevant sentencing precedents and that Robinson was not sentenced to caning because caning is not a penalty for any of the offences he was charged with. On the same day, Law Minister K. Shanmugam mentioned that the government would be considering what approaches are necessary for offenders like Robinson to be dealt with more severely through higher penalties.
 12 March 2017: 34-year-old Satheesh Kumar Manogaran and his cousin, 28-year-old Naveen Lal Pillar, were attacked by a group of three men – 21-year-old Muhammad Khalid bin Kamarudin, 22-year-old Muhammad Faizal bin Md Jamal and 26-year-old Shawalludin bin Sa'adon – near St James Power Station due to a previous conflict between Satheesh and Shawalludin. Satheesh, who sustained several stab wounds, was pronounced dead in hospital while Naveen survived his injuries. The police classified the case as a murder case. The three men, along with two other men – 27-year-old Muhammad Hisham bin Hassan and 19-year-old Muhd Firdaus bin Abdullah – were arrested and respectively charged with different offences. On 2 January 2018, Hisham was sentenced to 18 months' imprisonment for harbouring Khalid and Faizal, as well as abetting the trio to cause hurt to Satheesh and Naveen. On 30 May 2018, Firdaus was sentenced to six years and two months' jail and five strokes of the cane for harbouring Khalid and Faizal and other unrelated offences. On 26 November 2018, Shawalludin was sentenced to five years and six months' jail and six strokes of the cane for voluntarily causing grievous hurt to Satheesh. On 14 May 2019, Faizal, who was initially facing a murder charge together with Khalid, was sentenced to eight years and six months' jail and eight strokes of the cane for voluntarily causing grievous hurt to Satheesh, with another charge of causing hurt to Naveen. , Khalid is pending trial for murder.
 21 June 2017: 41-year-old Indonesian maid Khasanah had murdered her elderly employer 79-year-old Chia Ngim Fong, and his 78-year-old wife Chin Sek Fah in the couple's Bedok flat. Khasanah fled to Indonesia and was caught shortly after entering the country. Khasanah was not extradited back to Singapore for trial given that a local law decreed that Indonesians who committed crimes overseas but caught in their home country should be tried in their home country. The Singapore Police Force and Indonesian national police (Polri) thus worked together to investigate the Bedok double murder case. With these efforts, Khasanah was tried in Indonesia for the couple's murders and the local courts found her guilty of the murders. Originally sentenced to life imprisonment, Khasanah's life sentence was reduced to 20 years' of imprisonment upon her appeal, and she was ordered to serve her jail term in an Indonesian prison.
 10 July 2017: 69-year-old Tan Nam Seng stabbed his son-in-law, 38-year-old Spencer Tuppani, in broad daylight at Telok Ayer Street. Tuppani ran and collapsed outside an eatery on Boon Tat Street. Tan also prevented others from rendering help to Tuppani, leading to the latter's death in hospital shortly after. Tan was initially charged with murder on 12 July 2017 and remanded for three weeks for psychiatric evaluation. On 21 September 2020, High Court judge Dedar Singh Gill sentenced Tan to eight years and six months' imprisonment for culpable homicide not amounting to murder as Tan was found to be suffering from a major depressive disorder.
 16 August 2017: 48-year-old Mohammad Rosli Abdul Rahim, who was dissatisfied with the share of the monthly rent, argued with his 35-year-old flatmate Mohammad Roslan Zaini before he went into the kitchen to take a knife and stabbed Roslan out of anger due to his unpleasant remarks and alleged insults of Rosli's mother during the heated argument. Roslan, who was stabbed in the heart, died at a field outside his Teck Whye flat. Rosli was arrested and charged for murder, and he tried to argue that he was gravely provoked into killing Roslan out of a loss of self-control by anger. After a trial that took place from 16 February 2021 to 9 November 2021, Rosli was found guilty of murder, and two months later, he was sentenced to life imprisonment on 13 January 2022. Rosli is currently appealing against his murder conviction and sentence, with leading criminal lawyer Eugene Thuraisingam set to represent him in his appeal.
 2 September 2017: Romanian National Iosif Kiss and Frenchman David Weidmann cheated shipping firm Oceanic Group of $1.5 million. Weismann gave part of the money to a Dutchman named Nikolic Predrag and a Frenchwoman Nikolic Dalida. Kiss and Weidmann were arrested at Woodlands Checkpoint on the night of the crime. On 25 June 2018, Nikolic Predrag and Nikolic Dalida were sentenced to 2 and a half years imprisonment, while on 20 August 2018, Iosif Kiss and David Weidmann were sentenced to 3 years and 8 months imprisonment.
3 November 2017: Muhammad Adam Bin Mohamed Rashid was the first person to be found guilty of criminal breach of trust, by cheating via dark web in the first dark web case and was sentenced to 3 years imprisonment.

2018 
 26 January 2018: 36-year-old cleaning supervisor Munusamy Ramarmurth, a Malaysian working in Singapore for 14 years, was discovered importing 57.54g of heroin when the police arrested him and searched his motorcycle parked along Harbourfront Avenue. The judge Audrey Lim of the High Court found that he was not a courier and she disbelieved Munusamy's claim that he thought he was carrying stolen phones since he admitted to the presence of drugs to the police at first, hence Munusamy was given the mandatory death penalty on 15 November 2021.
 19 July 2018: 66-year-old retiree Seet Cher Hng armed himself with three knives and went to the carpark near ITE College Central, where he attacked his 56-year-old ex-wife Low Hwee Geok (or Michelle Low), with whom he had a daughter since they married in 1993 before they divorced in 2011. Seet apparently killed Low by stabbing her eight times before stabbing himself with his murder weapons. Seet was taken to hospital where he was treated and survived his wounds, and later charged with murder after the police officially arrested him in the hospital. Seet was said to be unhappy for years over Low's alleged infidelity and supposedly unfair division of their matrimonial assets, which motivated him to attack Low after she ignored his persistent requests for a share of $500,000 these last seven years. Seet was found guilty of murder on 14 September 2021, and eight days later, High Court judge Aedit Abdullah sentenced Seet to life imprisonment on 22 September 2021.
28 July 2018: 29-year-old Bangladeshi and former construction worker Sheikh Md Razan, having disguised himself as a Sikh by putting on a turban, entered a pawnshop in Boon Lay with an attempt to rob the shop. Using a fake gun and a newly bought chopper, he tried to coerce the employees to hand over any valuables and money to him, but he left empty-handed after failing to do so (as the employees had either being frozen with fear or hid themselves). Before leaving the pawnshop, Sheikh also left behind a device which he claimed to be a "bomb belt" (which made the employees believed it was real). The bomb belt was later revealed to be a fake after the police's bomb experts tested it. After a 5-day-long manhunt, Sheikh, who shaved off his beard and went into hiding, was arrested on 1 August 2018 and subsequently charged with attempted armed robbery. He was also charged with overstaying in Singapore since December 2017, as well as using a forged work permit to obtain employment. On 30 September 2019, Sheikh, who pleaded guilty to the offences he committed, was sentenced to 3 years and six months' imprisonment and 18 strokes of the cane.
 1 September 2018: In her family's flat in Bukit Batok, four-year-old Nursabrina "Sabrina" Agustiani Abdullah was allegedly kicked to death by her 25-year-old stepfather Muhammad Salihin Ismail, who married her mother in 2016 when Sabrina was only two. Salihin, who also fathered a pair of twin boys after his marriage, was charged with murder and child abuse two days after Sabrina died. The cause of death were some fatal abdominal injuries where Salihin kicked his stepdaughter in two successive incidents. Salihin, in his trial, stated that he and his wife tries to teach Sabrina to use the toilet properly in preparation for school, and out of anger over Sabrina still urinating the floor at her age, Salihin kicked in front of him and the blow somehow reached Sabrina's abdomen. Salihin also stated he tried to use CPR to revive her upon finding her unresponsive and overall, he did not intend to kill her. On 1 March 2022, over a year after his trial began (in February 2021), Salihin, who was defended by Eugene Thuraisingam, was acquitted of murder and instead found guilty of voluntarily causing grievous hurt, as the High Court's Justice Pang Khang Chau accepted that Salihin may have intentionally kicked Sabrina, he did so in the fit of anger and had no intent to kick any particular location of the girl's body, specifically the part that has the fatal injury, which cannot amount to a tangible murder conviction. On 9 May 2022, for causing grievous hurt to his stepdaughter, Salihin was sentenced to nine years' imprisonment and 12 strokes of the cane, with effect from the date of his arrest.The prosecution is currently appealing for Salihin to be convicted of murder, as well as the sentence imposed by the trial court.
 September 2018 – 28 June 2019: 31-year-old Lin Rongxin, a Chinese national who worked as a machinery technician in Singapore for 12 years, was arrested for a total of 64 rape and sexual assault charges involving at least twenty females (including 15 teenagers aged between 14 and 19). Lin, who was married with one son, was found to have used social media platforms like WeChat, and made use of several personas to lure underaged girls and adult women, and even extort them while pretending to be their saviours from harassment under another identity. Three of the underaged girls even became his girlfriends at one point without knowing he was the one who raped them. Lin spent three years awaiting trial before he pleaded guilty to seven out of 64 charges on 28 November 2022. He was consequently sentenced to 31 years' jail and 24 strokes of the cane by Justice Hoo Sheau Peng, who admonished Lin as a "depraved sexual predator" for the trauma he inflicted on the victims and high level of premeditation behind the crimes.
 19 November 2018: Prior to her murder, 35-year-old Desiree Tan Jiaping, who was then suffering from anxiety disorder and depression, threatened to kill her elderly father Tan Tian Chye before he strangled her to death during the confrontation. Tan, who was initially charged with murder, later pleaded guilty to a reduced charge of culpable homicide as a result of his clinical depression condition. It was also revealed that his daughter had been demanding the parents' attention and abused them despite Tan and his wife giving their care for her. The mitigating and tragic circumstances allowed the High Court to show leniency and sentenced Tan to two years and nine months in jail on 12 October 2020. Given that the sentence was backdated to the date of his arrest, and he served with good behaviour during his 22-month remand period behind bars, 66-year-old Tan Tian Chye was released from jail on one-third remission for good behaviour on the same day he was sentenced.
 30 December 2018: Ahmed Salim, a 31-year-old Bangladeshi worker, strangled his 34-year-old girlfriend Nurhidayati Wartono Surata, an Indonesian domestic worker, at the Golden Dragon Hotel in Geylang. Nurhidayati's body was found later that night by a hotel receptionist. Ahmed was arrested the next day and charged with murder on 2 January 2019. When his trial started in September 2020, Ahmed initially defended himself by saying that he was provoked into killing Nurhidayati, but High Court judge Mavis Chionh found that he had the intention to murder Nurhidayati when he found out that she was unfaithful to him and seeing other men. On 14 December 2020, Ahmed was sentenced to death for murder, but he appealed against his sentence and conviction. His appeal was rejected on 19 January 2022.

2019 
 12 March 2019: Shortly after he was fired from his job for the second time due to poor work performance, 24-year-old former warehouse employee and Malaysian Yee Jing Man armed himself with a knife and went to his former workplace at Sungei Kadut to attack his three employers in full view of his former colleagues. One of them, 29-year-old Chinese businessman Lin Xinjie was slashed several times on the neck and died, while another, 30-year-old Li Mingqiao, was grievously slashed on his scalp, face and fractured his jaw. In front of his 29-year-old third employer Ryan Pan Zai Xing (who escaped unscathed), Yee tried to kill himself by slashing his wrists and stabbing his own abdomen (which lacerated his liver) and was taken to hospital by the incoming police officers. Yee later recovered, and he was remanded in prison for charges of murder and voluntarily causing grievous hurt. Yee, who was found to be suffering from depression at the time of the offences, was later convicted of lesser offences of culpable homicide and voluntarily causing grievous hurt, and sentenced to a total of 20 years' imprisonment with no caning on 9 June 2021.
 29 May 2019: 42-year-old lawyer Jeffrey Ong Su Aun was arrested in Kuala Lumpur with a stolen Malaysian passport and extradited to Singapore after allegedly misappropriating what prosecutors believed to be "the largest amount of money ever misappropriated by a lawyer in Singapore". He has been held in remand since June 2019 and faced 76 charges including cheating, forgery and criminal breach of trust as an attorney in a case involving over S$75 million. The case first came to light after precision engineering firm Allied Technologies, one of Ong's clients, filed a police report in May 2019 over S$33.4 million having gone missing from its escrow account. , Ong's case is still pending.
 2 July 2019: Known as the 2019 Orchard Towers murder, 31-year-old Satheesh Noel s/o Gobidass was killed in a fight at Orchard Towers involving six other men and one woman: 27-year-old Tan Sen Yang, 26-year-old Joel Tan Yun Sheng, 26-year-old Chan Jia Xing, 26-year-old Ang Da Yuan, 25-year-old Loo Boon Chong, 22-year-old Tan Hong Sheng, and 22-year-old Natalie Siow Yu Zhen. On that day, the seven, along with their friends, had been drinking at a club in Orchard Towers. Ang got into a fight with Satheesh, while Siow, Joel Tan and Tan Sen Yang joined in. During the fight, Tan Sen Yang slashed Satheesh with a karambit; Satheesh eventually collapsed and died in hospital later due to a fatal stab wound to the neck. The seven were arrested and initially charged with murder by common intention on 4 July 2019. However, six of them eventually had their charges reduced to voluntarily causing hurt, consorting with a person possessing an offensive weapon, obstructing justice by discarding evidence, rioting, being a member of an unlawful assembly to assault a person, or any combination of these charges. On 4 March 2020, Ang was sentenced to eight months' jail and six strokes of the cane, while Joel Tan was sentenced to four weeks' jail. Siow was sentenced on 9 October 2020 to five months' jail. On 15 October 2020, Chan was given a conditional warning, which required him to refrain from criminal conduct for a year or else he would be prosecuted for the original offence along with any new offences committed. Shortly after Chan was sentenced, there were allegations on social media that Chan and others had received preferential treatment in sentencing because of their race. On 16 October 2020, the Attorney-General's Chambers refuted the allegations and directed the police to investigate those responsible for the allegations that are potentially in contempt of court. Loo was sentenced in January 2021 to five months' jail and fined S$1,000. Tan Hong Sheng, who had prior convictions for rioting and was out on bail at the time of the Orchard Towers incident, was sentenced on 5 March 2021 to four years and nine months' jail and 12 strokes of the cane. , Tan Sen Yang's case is still pending in the High Court.
 October 2019: Four men – 37-year-old Liong Tianwei, 26-year-old Leonard Teo Min Xuan, 19-year-old Justin Lee Han Shi and 17-year-old Abdillah bin Sabaruddin – were arrested for their suspected involvement in circulating obscene materials and promoting vice activities through a Telegram chat group called "SG Nasi Lemak". The chat group was used as a platform for sharing obscene photos and videos of women in Singapore. When it was still active, it had more than 44,000 members and members had to pay S$30 as an "entry fee" after its membership numbers spiked in the months before the arrests. On 16 October 2020, Lee and Abdillah (whose name was redacted in news reports as he was below 18 when he committed the offence) were sentenced to probation. Liong was sentenced to nine weeks' imprisonment and a fine of S$26,000 on 9 March 2021. On 3 June 2021, Teo was sentenced to mandatory treatment for a year after a report from the Institute of Mental Health diagnosed him with major depressive disorder and mentioned that it contributed to his offences.
 27 October 2019: Known as the Commonwealth double murders, 22-year-old Gabriel Lien Goh was arrested after he was alleged to have murdered both his mother and grandmother at their residential HDB block in Commonwealth, Singapore. Goh was charged with murdering his mother, 54-year-old Lee Soh Mui, a retired school teacher, the next day. On 18 November 2019, Goh was brought to court to be charged with murder in relation to the death of his grandmother, 90-year-old See Keng Keng. Goh was also found to be consuming drugs prior to his homicidal crime spree and he was first convicted and sentenced to 22 months' imprisonment on 11 November 2021 for both possession and consumption of drugs. On 23 September 2022, Goh was acquitted of lower charges of culpable homicide and he was sentenced to indefinite detention under the President's Pleasure as a result of him being of unsound mind as induced by drugs at the time he killed his mother and grandmother.
 8 November 2019: Nine-month-old male infant Izz Fayyaz Zayani Ahmad died from bleeding in the brain due to a traumatic head injury during his hospitalization. His mother's boyfriend, 27-year-old Mohamed Aliff Mohamed Yusoff, was arrested for voluntarily causing grievous hurt before the charge was upgraded to murder. It was alleged that Aliff intentionally caused the fatal head injuries to Izz by pushing his head against the floorboard of his van between 10pm on the night of 7 November and 12.15am the next day. Yet Aliff insisted that the boy sustained the injuries due to an accidental fall. On 13 July 2022, 29-year-old Aliff was found guilty of murder, and therefore he was sentenced to life imprisonment and 15 strokes of the cane on 11 August 2022, after the prosecution decided to not pursue the death penalty during his trial sentencing phase.

2020s

2020
 3 January 2020: Paul Leslie Quirk, a 48-year-old schizophrenic Australian, was arrested at his condominium at Compassvale after he allegedly killed his 43-year-old Singaporean wife Christina Khoo Gek Hwa, and threw his dog off their home's third-floor balcony, causing it to die from the effects of the fall. Initially charged with murder, Quirk was found guilty of a lesser charge of culpable homicide not amounting to murder as he was suffering from a relapse of his schizophrenia at the time he murdered Khoo. Quirk was later sentenced to serve a ten-year jail sentence on 24 May 2021.
 10 May 2020: Known as the Punggol Field murder, a 38-year-old jogger named Tay Rui Hao was attacked and heavily stabbed by another man, and although he called the ambulance while injured, he died while in hospital. It took about a week before the police arrested 20-year-old Surajsrikan Diwakar Mani Tripathi, who was caught by the CCTV cameras nearby the crime scene. Surajsrikan, who was charged with murder, was said to be emotionally affected by the date of his crime, as it happened to be same date when his father abandoned his mother (who was then pregnant with him) in 1999 some two months after their marriage, and the date of his military enlistment in 2018. He was assessed to be suffering from borderline intelligence, and both severe social anxiety disorder and obsessive compulsive disorder. These disorders had crippling effects on his life, leading to low mood and anger, but he was mentally sound and fit to stand trial. Surajsrikan was found guilty of murder and sentenced to life imprisonment with 15 strokes of the cane on 15 September 2022. The case of Tay's murder at the hands of Surajsrikan also prompted the government to pass laws to allow police to obtain data from TraceTogether for police investigations in every crime, including murder.
 27 August 2020: 24-year-old Chinese national Cui Huan, who was angered at his 27-year-old wife Liang Xueqiu's affair with another man, pushed her to the ground before he beat his wife up several times as she lay curled up on the concrete floor in Boon Lay, where his wife worked. Having suffered fatal injuries to her head due to either the fall, the subsequent assault or both, Liang died as a result of bleeding from the brain. Prior to the events, Cui and Liang were married in 2016 and had a child together, and they first came from China to Singapore in 2019 to find employment. Cui was initially charged with murder, but the prosecution later dismissed the murder charge in November 2021 and instead indicted Cui on a lower charge of voluntarily causing grievous hurt. On 15 February 2022, Cui pleaded guilty to the lower charge in his trial and was sentenced to seven years' jail and nine strokes of the cane.

2021 
 2 April 2021: 49-year-old Naing Lin, a cleaner on a work permit from Myanmar, used a knife to stab his roommate Myo Kyaw Thu, a 49-year-old engineer who is also from Myanmar, after he was provoked by Myo's insult which took place in the aftermath of their argument over Myo's issue of borrowing money from others despite his job. After stabbing Myo five times, Naing left the flat to spend the night in another place before he returned the next day, having unable to contact Myo, who was discovered dead due to the excessive bleeding from the knife wounds. Naing surrendered himself to the authorites, who charged him with murder, for which he was convicted as charged and sentenced to life imprisonment on 22 September 2022 after Naing pleaded guilty.
 12 April 2021: In the first case of an armed robbery involving firearms in 15 years, 38-year-old Aetos auxiliary police officer Mahadi Muhamad Mukhtar, who was riddled with huge debts, armed himself with his service revolver (loaded with five bullets) and proceed to rob a licensed moneylending company at Jurong. He managed to rob more than $24,800 from the company after threatening the employee with a gun and used part of the proceeds to pay off his debts while sending some of the cash to his girlfriend. On 13 September 2022, Mahadi was convicted of one charge of robbery and two charges of illegal possession of firearms and ammunition under the Arms Offences Act, and he was sentenced to 16 years and six months' imprisonment and 18 strokes of the cane. Mahadi's girlfriend was initially charged with dishonestly receiving stolen property in the same month of Mahadi's arrest, but after reviewing her case, the prosecution decided to drop their case and she received a discharge amounting to an acquittal in August 2022.
19 July 2021: In a case known as the River Valley High School attack, sixteen-year-old Secondary Four male student attacked and killed another thirteen-year old Secondary One male student with an axe in a fourth-floor toilet in River Valley High School. The attacker, who cannot be named due to his age, was arrested shortly after the incident and was charged with murder on 20 July. The attacker was found to have previously attempted suicide in 2019 and subsequently assessed at the Institute of Mental Health that same year.

2022 
21 January 2022: A pair of 11-year-old twin boys with disabilities were found dead in a canal next to a playground along Greenridge Crescent. Their 48-year-old father Xavier Yap Jung Houn was arrested on 22 January and two days later charged with the murder of one of his sons. He was held under custody at Changi Prison's Complex Medical Centre "for psychiatric observation" and will remain there until court proceedings resume on 18 February. If found guilty he will face death penalty.
17 February 2022: A knife-wielding man was shot by police officers during a confrontation outside Clementi Neighbourhood Police Centre at around 11pm. The man was identified to be 49-year-old Soo Cheow Wee who was involved in an earlier assault case that happened around 8:40pm where police were alerted that a 41-year-old man was allegedly assaulted with a knife by the same suspect along Block 420A Clementi Avenue 1. The 41-year-old man has sustained injuries on his right arm and wrist. Preliminary investigations revealed that neither of them knew each other. In a statement, the police revealed that right after the first incident took place, Soo took a taxi to Clementi Police Division and was seen wielding a knife while standing outside the police station. Officers that were on duty approached Soo but he was shouting at the police officers incoherently and despite repeated instructions to drop his knife, the suspect refused to do so and charged towards one of the officers, who fired a shot at Soo. Soo suffered a gunshot wound on his left arm and was detained by the officers, before he was taken to hospital for treatment. Soo was charged in court on 18 February 2022 for criminal intimidation and voluntarily causing hurt with a dangerous weapon, and on 26 October 2022, Soo, who turned 50 before his September 2022 trial, was convicted and sentenced to 33 months' imprisonment for committing these armed assaults, and he escaped caning due to his age.
 6 April 2022: Known as the Boon Lay slashing, 19-year-old Niswan Thiruchelvam and 20-year-old Muhammad Sajid Saleem both used bread knives to slash Praveen Raj Chanthiran and another man named Sarankumar Subramaniam at an open-air carpark, where a wedding was held nearby. The two victims (aged between 22 and 23), who were guests at the wedding, were sent to hospital for treatment, and both of them survived. After a manhunt, the two attackers were arrested and charged in court the next day for voluntarily causing grievous hurt to Sarankumar and Praveen, the latter whom Sajid wanted to hurt for contacting his girlfriend and thus led to him attacking Praveen and the other victim. Both Sajid and Niswan (who was married with a one-year-old daughter) were additionally charged for being a member of an unlawful assembly; since Niswan was 14 when he first joined a gang in 2016, his name was subsequently not reported due to offenders charged for crimes committed while they were underaged cannot be named. Sajid pleaded guilty to his charges on 2 November 2022 while Niswan was separately tried and convicted after he pled guilty to his charges a week later. On 30 November 2022, 21-year-old Sajid was sentenced to three years' imprisonment and six strokes of the cane while Niswan, who turned 20 before his trial, receives a heavier sentence of three years and three months plus six strokes of the cane; Niswan was also fined S$1,800 and given a 12-month driving ban for another unrelated traffic offence.
14 April 2022: A 46-year-old man was caught on video attacking a woman, believed to be his estranged wife, with a cleaver outside a restaurant she worked at along Beach Road, slashing her several times. The victim was saved by her colleagues, passers-by and workers from other restaurants who drove off her assailant using ladders, signs and chairs. During the ordeal, the man attempted to retaliate against the woman's saviors and was also seen slitting his own wrists. He was eventually cornered in another restaurant where police officers managed to subdue him with a taser. Both individuals survived and were taken to hospital for treatment. The man, a Chinese national, was later charged on 16 April 2022 for attempted murder.
4 July 2022: 26-year-old Singaporean PR (born in China) and his wife, a Thai national, fled Singapore by hiding in a container compartment of a lorry departing for Malaysia. Both of them were wanted in connection with a luxury goods scam amounting to S$32 million in undelivered goods. Two Malaysian men, one 38-years-old and the other 40-years-old, were arrested and charged for helping the couple depart Singapore illegally. An Interpol red notice was issued for the couple on 21 July. On 11 August 2022, they were arrested in Johor Bahru after they were found to be hiding in a hotel. They were brought back to Singapore on the same day, and charged in court on Friday, 12 August 2022. Investigations are ongoing.
10 October 2022: 19-year-old Sylesnar Seah Jie Kai attacked and killed his 47-year-old father Eddie Seah Wee Teck at their flat, Block 653 Yishun Avenue 4. Sylesnar Seah, the youngest of three children in his family, was arrested at the scene of crime. He was charged in court two days later on 12 October.

See also
 Capital punishment in Singapore
 Life imprisonment in Singapore
 List of major crimes in Singapore (before 2000)

References

Major crimes
Major crimes